

483001–483100 

|-bgcolor=#d6d6d6
| 483001 ||  || — || March 10, 2007 || Kitt Peak || Spacewatch || — || align=right | 3.3 km || 
|-id=002 bgcolor=#C2E0FF
| 483002 ||  || — || August 19, 2014 || Cerro Tololo-DECam || CTIO-DES || other TNO || align=right | 358 km || 
|-id=003 bgcolor=#d6d6d6
| 483003 ||  || — || January 10, 2006 || Mount Lemmon || Mount Lemmon Survey || EOS || align=right | 2.4 km || 
|-id=004 bgcolor=#fefefe
| 483004 ||  || — || January 1, 2012 || Mount Lemmon || Mount Lemmon Survey || — || align=right data-sort-value="0.91" | 910 m || 
|-id=005 bgcolor=#d6d6d6
| 483005 ||  || — || January 20, 2010 || WISE || WISE || — || align=right | 5.0 km || 
|-id=006 bgcolor=#E9E9E9
| 483006 ||  || — || October 22, 2005 || Catalina || CSS || — || align=right | 2.1 km || 
|-id=007 bgcolor=#fefefe
| 483007 ||  || — || December 29, 2011 || Kitt Peak || Spacewatch || V || align=right data-sort-value="0.72" | 720 m || 
|-id=008 bgcolor=#C2FFFF
| 483008 ||  || — || May 29, 2009 || Mount Lemmon || Mount Lemmon Survey || L5 || align=right | 9.4 km || 
|-id=009 bgcolor=#d6d6d6
| 483009 ||  || — || September 25, 2008 || Kitt Peak || Spacewatch || — || align=right | 3.2 km || 
|-id=010 bgcolor=#fefefe
| 483010 ||  || — || February 2, 2009 || Kitt Peak || Spacewatch || — || align=right data-sort-value="0.73" | 730 m || 
|-id=011 bgcolor=#E9E9E9
| 483011 ||  || — || November 5, 2010 || Mount Lemmon || Mount Lemmon Survey || — || align=right | 3.0 km || 
|-id=012 bgcolor=#E9E9E9
| 483012 ||  || — || September 15, 2009 || Kitt Peak || Spacewatch || — || align=right | 2.9 km || 
|-id=013 bgcolor=#E9E9E9
| 483013 ||  || — || December 6, 2005 || Kitt Peak || Spacewatch || — || align=right | 2.6 km || 
|-id=014 bgcolor=#C2FFFF
| 483014 ||  || — || March 10, 2007 || Mount Lemmon || Mount Lemmon Survey || L5 || align=right | 11 km || 
|-id=015 bgcolor=#E9E9E9
| 483015 ||  || — || October 5, 2005 || Catalina || CSS || — || align=right | 2.4 km || 
|-id=016 bgcolor=#d6d6d6
| 483016 ||  || — || April 18, 2007 || Mount Lemmon || Mount Lemmon Survey || — || align=right | 2.3 km || 
|-id=017 bgcolor=#E9E9E9
| 483017 ||  || — || January 28, 2007 || Kitt Peak || Spacewatch || — || align=right | 2.2 km || 
|-id=018 bgcolor=#C2FFFF
| 483018 ||  || — || October 12, 2013 || Mount Lemmon || Mount Lemmon Survey || L5 || align=right | 7.2 km || 
|-id=019 bgcolor=#fefefe
| 483019 ||  || — || November 15, 2003 || Kitt Peak || Spacewatch || — || align=right data-sort-value="0.94" | 940 m || 
|-id=020 bgcolor=#C2FFFF
| 483020 ||  || — || March 10, 2008 || Mount Lemmon || Mount Lemmon Survey || L5 || align=right | 12 km || 
|-id=021 bgcolor=#C2FFFF
| 483021 ||  || — || April 7, 2008 || Kitt Peak || Spacewatch || L5 || align=right | 8.2 km || 
|-id=022 bgcolor=#d6d6d6
| 483022 ||  || — || October 5, 2014 || Mount Lemmon || Mount Lemmon Survey || TEL || align=right | 1.7 km || 
|-id=023 bgcolor=#E9E9E9
| 483023 ||  || — || February 9, 2007 || Kitt Peak || Spacewatch || — || align=right | 2.5 km || 
|-id=024 bgcolor=#C2FFFF
| 483024 ||  || — || April 19, 2010 || WISE || WISE || L5 || align=right | 11 km || 
|-id=025 bgcolor=#C2FFFF
| 483025 ||  || — || December 18, 2004 || Mount Lemmon || Mount Lemmon Survey || L5 || align=right | 11 km || 
|-id=026 bgcolor=#C2FFFF
| 483026 ||  || — || January 15, 2005 || Kitt Peak || Spacewatch || L5 || align=right | 7.9 km || 
|-id=027 bgcolor=#C2FFFF
| 483027 ||  || — || January 26, 2006 || Mount Lemmon || Mount Lemmon Survey || L5 || align=right | 11 km || 
|-id=028 bgcolor=#E9E9E9
| 483028 ||  || — || September 30, 2009 || Mount Lemmon || Mount Lemmon Survey || NEM || align=right | 2.5 km || 
|-id=029 bgcolor=#d6d6d6
| 483029 ||  || — || May 13, 2000 || Kitt Peak || Spacewatch || EOS || align=right | 2.1 km || 
|-id=030 bgcolor=#fefefe
| 483030 ||  || — || December 29, 2003 || Catalina || CSS || H || align=right data-sort-value="0.85" | 850 m || 
|-id=031 bgcolor=#fefefe
| 483031 ||  || — || October 31, 2005 || Mount Lemmon || Mount Lemmon Survey || — || align=right data-sort-value="0.80" | 800 m || 
|-id=032 bgcolor=#E9E9E9
| 483032 ||  || — || June 12, 2007 || Kitt Peak || Spacewatch || — || align=right data-sort-value="0.89" | 890 m || 
|-id=033 bgcolor=#fefefe
| 483033 ||  || — || September 21, 2009 || Mount Lemmon || Mount Lemmon Survey || — || align=right data-sort-value="0.83" | 830 m || 
|-id=034 bgcolor=#fefefe
| 483034 ||  || — || March 10, 2011 || Kitt Peak || Spacewatch || — || align=right data-sort-value="0.90" | 900 m || 
|-id=035 bgcolor=#FA8072
| 483035 ||  || — || June 7, 2008 || Siding Spring || SSS || H || align=right data-sort-value="0.77" | 770 m || 
|-id=036 bgcolor=#fefefe
| 483036 ||  || — || October 6, 2008 || Catalina || CSS || H || align=right data-sort-value="0.84" | 840 m || 
|-id=037 bgcolor=#fefefe
| 483037 ||  || — || December 1, 2011 || Catalina || CSS || H || align=right data-sort-value="0.62" | 620 m || 
|-id=038 bgcolor=#fefefe
| 483038 ||  || — || February 19, 2007 || Catalina || CSS || H || align=right data-sort-value="0.94" | 940 m || 
|-id=039 bgcolor=#fefefe
| 483039 ||  || — || March 13, 2008 || Kitt Peak || Spacewatch || — || align=right data-sort-value="0.82" | 820 m || 
|-id=040 bgcolor=#fefefe
| 483040 ||  || — || August 29, 2009 || Catalina || CSS || — || align=right data-sort-value="0.82" | 820 m || 
|-id=041 bgcolor=#fefefe
| 483041 ||  || — || June 8, 2005 || Kitt Peak || Spacewatch || — || align=right data-sort-value="0.91" | 910 m || 
|-id=042 bgcolor=#E9E9E9
| 483042 ||  || — || July 27, 1995 || Kitt Peak || Spacewatch || — || align=right | 1.2 km || 
|-id=043 bgcolor=#fefefe
| 483043 ||  || — || May 5, 2008 || Mount Lemmon || Mount Lemmon Survey || — || align=right data-sort-value="0.86" | 860 m || 
|-id=044 bgcolor=#fefefe
| 483044 ||  || — || October 25, 2005 || Mount Lemmon || Mount Lemmon Survey || MAS || align=right data-sort-value="0.71" | 710 m || 
|-id=045 bgcolor=#fefefe
| 483045 ||  || — || May 9, 2004 || Kitt Peak || Spacewatch || — || align=right data-sort-value="0.68" | 680 m || 
|-id=046 bgcolor=#fefefe
| 483046 ||  || — || May 12, 2007 || Kitt Peak || Spacewatch || H || align=right data-sort-value="0.68" | 680 m || 
|-id=047 bgcolor=#fefefe
| 483047 ||  || — || April 30, 2008 || Mount Lemmon || Mount Lemmon Survey || V || align=right data-sort-value="0.56" | 560 m || 
|-id=048 bgcolor=#E9E9E9
| 483048 ||  || — || June 6, 2011 || Mount Lemmon || Mount Lemmon Survey || — || align=right | 1.5 km || 
|-id=049 bgcolor=#E9E9E9
| 483049 ||  || — || June 4, 2011 || Mount Lemmon || Mount Lemmon Survey || — || align=right data-sort-value="0.93" | 930 m || 
|-id=050 bgcolor=#E9E9E9
| 483050 ||  || — || May 26, 2011 || Mount Lemmon || Mount Lemmon Survey || — || align=right | 1.1 km || 
|-id=051 bgcolor=#fefefe
| 483051 ||  || — || August 23, 1998 || Kitt Peak || Spacewatch || — || align=right data-sort-value="0.73" | 730 m || 
|-id=052 bgcolor=#fefefe
| 483052 ||  || — || May 28, 2008 || Mount Lemmon || Mount Lemmon Survey || — || align=right | 1.0 km || 
|-id=053 bgcolor=#E9E9E9
| 483053 ||  || — || November 9, 1996 || Kitt Peak || Spacewatch || — || align=right data-sort-value="0.96" | 960 m || 
|-id=054 bgcolor=#E9E9E9
| 483054 ||  || — || November 1, 2008 || Mount Lemmon || Mount Lemmon Survey || — || align=right data-sort-value="0.90" | 900 m || 
|-id=055 bgcolor=#fefefe
| 483055 ||  || — || November 28, 2005 || Mount Lemmon || Mount Lemmon Survey || — || align=right data-sort-value="0.98" | 980 m || 
|-id=056 bgcolor=#E9E9E9
| 483056 ||  || — || June 3, 2011 || Mount Lemmon || Mount Lemmon Survey || MIS || align=right | 2.1 km || 
|-id=057 bgcolor=#E9E9E9
| 483057 ||  || — || December 3, 2012 || Mount Lemmon || Mount Lemmon Survey || — || align=right | 1.2 km || 
|-id=058 bgcolor=#fefefe
| 483058 ||  || — || November 19, 2006 || Catalina || CSS || — || align=right data-sort-value="0.73" | 730 m || 
|-id=059 bgcolor=#fefefe
| 483059 ||  || — || April 4, 2011 || Kitt Peak || Spacewatch || — || align=right data-sort-value="0.83" | 830 m || 
|-id=060 bgcolor=#d6d6d6
| 483060 ||  || — || May 23, 2010 || WISE || WISE || — || align=right | 3.4 km || 
|-id=061 bgcolor=#E9E9E9
| 483061 ||  || — || March 25, 2006 || Kitt Peak || Spacewatch || — || align=right | 1.8 km || 
|-id=062 bgcolor=#E9E9E9
| 483062 ||  || — || September 25, 2012 || Mount Lemmon || Mount Lemmon Survey || (5) || align=right data-sort-value="0.71" | 710 m || 
|-id=063 bgcolor=#fefefe
| 483063 ||  || — || September 4, 2008 || Kitt Peak || Spacewatch || MAS || align=right data-sort-value="0.77" | 770 m || 
|-id=064 bgcolor=#E9E9E9
| 483064 ||  || — || May 27, 1998 || Kitt Peak || Spacewatch || — || align=right | 2.1 km || 
|-id=065 bgcolor=#fefefe
| 483065 ||  || — || December 19, 2003 || Socorro || LINEAR || H || align=right data-sort-value="0.88" | 880 m || 
|-id=066 bgcolor=#fefefe
| 483066 ||  || — || August 9, 2004 || Anderson Mesa || LONEOS || NYS || align=right data-sort-value="0.70" | 700 m || 
|-id=067 bgcolor=#fefefe
| 483067 ||  || — || October 5, 2005 || Kitt Peak || Spacewatch || H || align=right data-sort-value="0.41" | 410 m || 
|-id=068 bgcolor=#fefefe
| 483068 ||  || — || October 26, 2009 || Mount Lemmon || Mount Lemmon Survey || — || align=right data-sort-value="0.89" | 890 m || 
|-id=069 bgcolor=#E9E9E9
| 483069 ||  || — || December 3, 2012 || Mount Lemmon || Mount Lemmon Survey || — || align=right | 1.0 km || 
|-id=070 bgcolor=#E9E9E9
| 483070 ||  || — || November 4, 2004 || Kitt Peak || Spacewatch || — || align=right | 2.7 km || 
|-id=071 bgcolor=#E9E9E9
| 483071 ||  || — || June 7, 2010 || WISE || WISE || — || align=right | 3.2 km || 
|-id=072 bgcolor=#E9E9E9
| 483072 ||  || — || December 21, 2012 || Mount Lemmon || Mount Lemmon Survey || — || align=right | 1.4 km || 
|-id=073 bgcolor=#E9E9E9
| 483073 ||  || — || December 30, 2008 || Mount Lemmon || Mount Lemmon Survey || — || align=right | 1.6 km || 
|-id=074 bgcolor=#d6d6d6
| 483074 ||  || — || December 26, 2006 || Kitt Peak || Spacewatch || — || align=right | 2.7 km || 
|-id=075 bgcolor=#fefefe
| 483075 ||  || — || December 6, 2008 || Kitt Peak || Spacewatch || — || align=right data-sort-value="0.93" | 930 m || 
|-id=076 bgcolor=#E9E9E9
| 483076 ||  || — || June 9, 2010 || WISE || WISE || — || align=right | 1.1 km || 
|-id=077 bgcolor=#E9E9E9
| 483077 ||  || — || June 25, 2011 || Kitt Peak || Spacewatch || — || align=right | 1.5 km || 
|-id=078 bgcolor=#E9E9E9
| 483078 ||  || — || November 13, 2006 || Socorro || LINEAR || — || align=right | 2.7 km || 
|-id=079 bgcolor=#fefefe
| 483079 ||  || — || April 15, 2007 || Catalina || CSS || — || align=right data-sort-value="0.98" | 980 m || 
|-id=080 bgcolor=#E9E9E9
| 483080 ||  || — || November 3, 2008 || Kitt Peak || Spacewatch || — || align=right | 2.7 km || 
|-id=081 bgcolor=#d6d6d6
| 483081 ||  || — || May 15, 2010 || WISE || WISE || EMA || align=right | 4.4 km || 
|-id=082 bgcolor=#E9E9E9
| 483082 ||  || — || November 25, 2012 || Kitt Peak || Spacewatch || EUN || align=right | 1.2 km || 
|-id=083 bgcolor=#fefefe
| 483083 ||  || — || October 8, 2004 || Kitt Peak || Spacewatch || V || align=right data-sort-value="0.62" | 620 m || 
|-id=084 bgcolor=#fefefe
| 483084 ||  || — || October 4, 2006 || Mount Lemmon || Mount Lemmon Survey || — || align=right data-sort-value="0.58" | 580 m || 
|-id=085 bgcolor=#d6d6d6
| 483085 ||  || — || July 23, 2010 || WISE || WISE || LIX || align=right | 4.8 km || 
|-id=086 bgcolor=#E9E9E9
| 483086 ||  || — || November 20, 2008 || Mount Lemmon || Mount Lemmon Survey || — || align=right | 1.1 km || 
|-id=087 bgcolor=#d6d6d6
| 483087 ||  || — || October 29, 2005 || Mount Lemmon || Mount Lemmon Survey || — || align=right | 3.9 km || 
|-id=088 bgcolor=#E9E9E9
| 483088 ||  || — || May 20, 2006 || Catalina || CSS || — || align=right | 1.6 km || 
|-id=089 bgcolor=#E9E9E9
| 483089 ||  || — || January 29, 2014 || Kitt Peak || Spacewatch || — || align=right | 1.8 km || 
|-id=090 bgcolor=#d6d6d6
| 483090 ||  || — || April 23, 2014 || Mount Lemmon || Mount Lemmon Survey || — || align=right | 3.0 km || 
|-id=091 bgcolor=#E9E9E9
| 483091 ||  || — || July 18, 2007 || Mount Lemmon || Mount Lemmon Survey || — || align=right data-sort-value="0.94" | 940 m || 
|-id=092 bgcolor=#E9E9E9
| 483092 ||  || — || September 19, 2003 || Anderson Mesa || LONEOS || — || align=right | 1.2 km || 
|-id=093 bgcolor=#E9E9E9
| 483093 ||  || — || June 27, 2011 || Kitt Peak || Spacewatch || — || align=right | 1.1 km || 
|-id=094 bgcolor=#fefefe
| 483094 ||  || — || November 19, 2009 || Kitt Peak || Spacewatch || — || align=right data-sort-value="0.94" | 940 m || 
|-id=095 bgcolor=#fefefe
| 483095 ||  || — || September 2, 2008 || Kitt Peak || Spacewatch || — || align=right data-sort-value="0.90" | 900 m || 
|-id=096 bgcolor=#d6d6d6
| 483096 ||  || — || December 15, 2006 || Kitt Peak || Spacewatch || — || align=right | 2.4 km || 
|-id=097 bgcolor=#fefefe
| 483097 ||  || — || June 9, 2007 || Kitt Peak || Spacewatch || — || align=right | 1.0 km || 
|-id=098 bgcolor=#E9E9E9
| 483098 ||  || — || December 31, 2008 || Kitt Peak || Spacewatch || — || align=right data-sort-value="0.89" | 890 m || 
|-id=099 bgcolor=#E9E9E9
| 483099 ||  || — || October 4, 1999 || Kitt Peak || Spacewatch || — || align=right data-sort-value="0.95" | 950 m || 
|-id=100 bgcolor=#E9E9E9
| 483100 ||  || — || October 8, 2007 || Kitt Peak || Spacewatch || — || align=right | 1.5 km || 
|}

483101–483200 

|-bgcolor=#E9E9E9
| 483101 ||  || — || October 19, 2007 || Kitt Peak || Spacewatch || — || align=right | 2.0 km || 
|-id=102 bgcolor=#d6d6d6
| 483102 ||  || — || June 27, 2009 || Mount Lemmon || Mount Lemmon Survey || — || align=right | 3.2 km || 
|-id=103 bgcolor=#d6d6d6
| 483103 ||  || — || June 19, 2010 || WISE || WISE || — || align=right | 2.7 km || 
|-id=104 bgcolor=#fefefe
| 483104 ||  || — || September 22, 2009 || Kitt Peak || Spacewatch || — || align=right data-sort-value="0.71" | 710 m || 
|-id=105 bgcolor=#d6d6d6
| 483105 ||  || — || June 28, 2010 || WISE || WISE || — || align=right | 3.3 km || 
|-id=106 bgcolor=#fefefe
| 483106 ||  || — || April 4, 2008 || Kitt Peak || Spacewatch || — || align=right data-sort-value="0.66" | 660 m || 
|-id=107 bgcolor=#d6d6d6
| 483107 ||  || — || July 3, 2010 || WISE || WISE || — || align=right | 2.5 km || 
|-id=108 bgcolor=#E9E9E9
| 483108 ||  || — || October 23, 2011 || Mount Lemmon || Mount Lemmon Survey || — || align=right | 1.9 km || 
|-id=109 bgcolor=#d6d6d6
| 483109 ||  || — || April 20, 2009 || Kitt Peak || Spacewatch || — || align=right | 2.8 km || 
|-id=110 bgcolor=#d6d6d6
| 483110 ||  || — || June 18, 2010 || WISE || WISE || — || align=right | 3.4 km || 
|-id=111 bgcolor=#d6d6d6
| 483111 ||  || — || July 11, 2010 || WISE || WISE || — || align=right | 4.3 km || 
|-id=112 bgcolor=#fefefe
| 483112 ||  || — || April 4, 2014 || Mount Lemmon || Mount Lemmon Survey || — || align=right | 1.0 km || 
|-id=113 bgcolor=#d6d6d6
| 483113 ||  || — || February 11, 2008 || Kitt Peak || Spacewatch || — || align=right | 2.6 km || 
|-id=114 bgcolor=#d6d6d6
| 483114 ||  || — || November 5, 2005 || Kitt Peak || Spacewatch || — || align=right | 2.9 km || 
|-id=115 bgcolor=#E9E9E9
| 483115 ||  || — || May 25, 2007 || Mount Lemmon || Mount Lemmon Survey || — || align=right | 1.2 km || 
|-id=116 bgcolor=#E9E9E9
| 483116 ||  || — || December 12, 2004 || Kitt Peak || Spacewatch || — || align=right | 1.1 km || 
|-id=117 bgcolor=#fefefe
| 483117 ||  || — || January 10, 2006 || Mount Lemmon || Mount Lemmon Survey || — || align=right | 1.0 km || 
|-id=118 bgcolor=#E9E9E9
| 483118 ||  || — || March 1, 2005 || Kitt Peak || Spacewatch || — || align=right | 1.00 km || 
|-id=119 bgcolor=#fefefe
| 483119 ||  || — || January 9, 2002 || Socorro || LINEAR || — || align=right | 1.0 km || 
|-id=120 bgcolor=#fefefe
| 483120 ||  || — || January 23, 2006 || Kitt Peak || Spacewatch || — || align=right | 1.1 km || 
|-id=121 bgcolor=#d6d6d6
| 483121 ||  || — || December 3, 2007 || Kitt Peak || Spacewatch || — || align=right | 3.7 km || 
|-id=122 bgcolor=#E9E9E9
| 483122 ||  || — || October 30, 2007 || Mount Lemmon || Mount Lemmon Survey || — || align=right | 1.5 km || 
|-id=123 bgcolor=#E9E9E9
| 483123 ||  || — || October 20, 2011 || Mount Lemmon || Mount Lemmon Survey || AGN || align=right | 1.2 km || 
|-id=124 bgcolor=#E9E9E9
| 483124 ||  || — || December 18, 2007 || Kitt Peak || Spacewatch || — || align=right | 2.5 km || 
|-id=125 bgcolor=#E9E9E9
| 483125 ||  || — || March 10, 2005 || Mount Lemmon || Mount Lemmon Survey || — || align=right | 1.3 km || 
|-id=126 bgcolor=#E9E9E9
| 483126 ||  || — || December 1, 2008 || Kitt Peak || Spacewatch || — || align=right data-sort-value="0.89" | 890 m || 
|-id=127 bgcolor=#d6d6d6
| 483127 ||  || — || October 9, 2010 || Kitt Peak || Spacewatch || HYG || align=right | 2.0 km || 
|-id=128 bgcolor=#E9E9E9
| 483128 ||  || — || September 21, 2011 || Kitt Peak || Spacewatch || AGN || align=right | 1.2 km || 
|-id=129 bgcolor=#E9E9E9
| 483129 ||  || — || April 7, 2005 || Kitt Peak || Spacewatch || PAD || align=right | 1.4 km || 
|-id=130 bgcolor=#fefefe
| 483130 ||  || — || December 15, 2009 || Mount Lemmon || Mount Lemmon Survey || V || align=right data-sort-value="0.68" | 680 m || 
|-id=131 bgcolor=#d6d6d6
| 483131 ||  || — || July 30, 2010 || WISE || WISE || — || align=right | 3.3 km || 
|-id=132 bgcolor=#fefefe
| 483132 ||  || — || April 30, 2003 || Kitt Peak || Spacewatch || — || align=right data-sort-value="0.90" | 900 m || 
|-id=133 bgcolor=#E9E9E9
| 483133 ||  || — || January 17, 2009 || Kitt Peak || Spacewatch || — || align=right data-sort-value="0.91" | 910 m || 
|-id=134 bgcolor=#E9E9E9
| 483134 ||  || — || March 31, 2014 || Mount Lemmon || Mount Lemmon Survey || — || align=right | 1.9 km || 
|-id=135 bgcolor=#d6d6d6
| 483135 ||  || — || December 12, 1999 || Socorro || LINEAR || — || align=right | 2.9 km || 
|-id=136 bgcolor=#E9E9E9
| 483136 ||  || — || July 3, 2011 || Mount Lemmon || Mount Lemmon Survey || EUN || align=right | 1.3 km || 
|-id=137 bgcolor=#d6d6d6
| 483137 ||  || — || September 12, 2004 || Socorro || LINEAR || — || align=right | 4.0 km || 
|-id=138 bgcolor=#E9E9E9
| 483138 ||  || — || June 23, 2010 || WISE || WISE || — || align=right | 3.2 km || 
|-id=139 bgcolor=#E9E9E9
| 483139 ||  || — || January 15, 2009 || Kitt Peak || Spacewatch || — || align=right | 2.5 km || 
|-id=140 bgcolor=#d6d6d6
| 483140 ||  || — || September 6, 1999 || Kitt Peak || Spacewatch || Tj (2.94) || align=right | 4.4 km || 
|-id=141 bgcolor=#d6d6d6
| 483141 ||  || — || February 2, 2008 || Mount Lemmon || Mount Lemmon Survey || — || align=right | 2.5 km || 
|-id=142 bgcolor=#fefefe
| 483142 ||  || — || March 4, 2011 || Mount Lemmon || Mount Lemmon Survey || — || align=right data-sort-value="0.66" | 660 m || 
|-id=143 bgcolor=#E9E9E9
| 483143 ||  || — || October 23, 2003 || Kitt Peak || Spacewatch || — || align=right | 1.3 km || 
|-id=144 bgcolor=#d6d6d6
| 483144 ||  || — || July 27, 2004 || Siding Spring || SSS || — || align=right | 5.2 km || 
|-id=145 bgcolor=#E9E9E9
| 483145 ||  || — || December 28, 2007 || Kitt Peak || Spacewatch || — || align=right | 2.4 km || 
|-id=146 bgcolor=#d6d6d6
| 483146 ||  || — || October 18, 2006 || Kitt Peak || Spacewatch || — || align=right | 2.2 km || 
|-id=147 bgcolor=#d6d6d6
| 483147 ||  || — || September 6, 2010 || Socorro || LINEAR || — || align=right | 3.0 km || 
|-id=148 bgcolor=#fefefe
| 483148 ||  || — || November 19, 1995 || Kitt Peak || Spacewatch || — || align=right data-sort-value="0.89" | 890 m || 
|-id=149 bgcolor=#d6d6d6
| 483149 ||  || — || May 26, 2010 || WISE || WISE || — || align=right | 3.6 km || 
|-id=150 bgcolor=#fefefe
| 483150 ||  || — || November 26, 2005 || Kitt Peak || Spacewatch || — || align=right data-sort-value="0.98" | 980 m || 
|-id=151 bgcolor=#E9E9E9
| 483151 ||  || — || August 28, 2006 || Kitt Peak || Spacewatch || — || align=right | 2.1 km || 
|-id=152 bgcolor=#d6d6d6
| 483152 ||  || — || July 20, 2010 || WISE || WISE || LIX || align=right | 3.0 km || 
|-id=153 bgcolor=#d6d6d6
| 483153 ||  || — || July 22, 2010 || WISE || WISE || — || align=right | 3.2 km || 
|-id=154 bgcolor=#d6d6d6
| 483154 ||  || — || August 10, 2010 || WISE || WISE || — || align=right | 3.0 km || 
|-id=155 bgcolor=#d6d6d6
| 483155 ||  || — || July 29, 2010 || WISE || WISE || LIX || align=right | 3.5 km || 
|-id=156 bgcolor=#E9E9E9
| 483156 ||  || — || August 10, 2007 || Kitt Peak || Spacewatch || — || align=right | 1.1 km || 
|-id=157 bgcolor=#d6d6d6
| 483157 ||  || — || January 10, 2007 || Mount Lemmon || Mount Lemmon Survey || — || align=right | 3.0 km || 
|-id=158 bgcolor=#d6d6d6
| 483158 ||  || — || September 11, 2004 || Kitt Peak || Spacewatch || — || align=right | 2.8 km || 
|-id=159 bgcolor=#d6d6d6
| 483159 ||  || — || August 2, 2010 || WISE || WISE || — || align=right | 3.2 km || 
|-id=160 bgcolor=#d6d6d6
| 483160 ||  || — || December 25, 2005 || Kitt Peak || Spacewatch || — || align=right | 3.0 km || 
|-id=161 bgcolor=#d6d6d6
| 483161 ||  || — || July 15, 2010 || WISE || WISE || LIX || align=right | 3.2 km || 
|-id=162 bgcolor=#d6d6d6
| 483162 ||  || — || February 28, 2008 || Kitt Peak || Spacewatch || EOS || align=right | 1.6 km || 
|-id=163 bgcolor=#E9E9E9
| 483163 ||  || — || January 4, 2013 || Mount Lemmon || Mount Lemmon Survey || — || align=right | 1.2 km || 
|-id=164 bgcolor=#E9E9E9
| 483164 ||  || — || June 22, 2010 || WISE || WISE || — || align=right | 1.1 km || 
|-id=165 bgcolor=#fefefe
| 483165 ||  || — || February 1, 2009 || Catalina || CSS || H || align=right data-sort-value="0.87" | 870 m || 
|-id=166 bgcolor=#d6d6d6
| 483166 ||  || — || December 13, 2006 || Mount Lemmon || Mount Lemmon Survey || — || align=right | 3.2 km || 
|-id=167 bgcolor=#d6d6d6
| 483167 ||  || — || February 14, 2013 || Kitt Peak || Spacewatch || — || align=right | 2.1 km || 
|-id=168 bgcolor=#fefefe
| 483168 ||  || — || January 28, 2006 || Kitt Peak || Spacewatch || — || align=right data-sort-value="0.87" | 870 m || 
|-id=169 bgcolor=#E9E9E9
| 483169 ||  || — || September 23, 2011 || Kitt Peak || Spacewatch || — || align=right | 2.0 km || 
|-id=170 bgcolor=#E9E9E9
| 483170 ||  || — || March 10, 2005 || Mount Lemmon || Mount Lemmon Survey || — || align=right | 1.8 km || 
|-id=171 bgcolor=#d6d6d6
| 483171 ||  || — || July 20, 2010 || WISE || WISE || EOS || align=right | 2.8 km || 
|-id=172 bgcolor=#E9E9E9
| 483172 ||  || — || May 8, 2005 || Kitt Peak || Spacewatch || — || align=right | 2.0 km || 
|-id=173 bgcolor=#d6d6d6
| 483173 ||  || — || July 19, 2010 || WISE || WISE || VER || align=right | 3.3 km || 
|-id=174 bgcolor=#d6d6d6
| 483174 ||  || — || July 25, 2010 || WISE || WISE || — || align=right | 3.8 km || 
|-id=175 bgcolor=#fefefe
| 483175 ||  || — || April 20, 2007 || Kitt Peak || Spacewatch || — || align=right | 1.1 km || 
|-id=176 bgcolor=#d6d6d6
| 483176 ||  || — || February 22, 2006 || Catalina || CSS || — || align=right | 3.4 km || 
|-id=177 bgcolor=#fefefe
| 483177 ||  || — || February 15, 2001 || Socorro || LINEAR || H || align=right data-sort-value="0.86" | 860 m || 
|-id=178 bgcolor=#d6d6d6
| 483178 ||  || — || September 2, 2010 || Mount Lemmon || Mount Lemmon Survey || — || align=right | 2.3 km || 
|-id=179 bgcolor=#d6d6d6
| 483179 ||  || — || June 16, 2010 || WISE || WISE || — || align=right | 3.2 km || 
|-id=180 bgcolor=#d6d6d6
| 483180 ||  || — || June 21, 2010 || WISE || WISE || — || align=right | 2.5 km || 
|-id=181 bgcolor=#fefefe
| 483181 ||  || — || October 7, 2005 || Kitt Peak || Spacewatch || — || align=right data-sort-value="0.95" | 950 m || 
|-id=182 bgcolor=#fefefe
| 483182 ||  || — || November 25, 2005 || Kitt Peak || Spacewatch || — || align=right data-sort-value="0.68" | 680 m || 
|-id=183 bgcolor=#E9E9E9
| 483183 ||  || — || January 20, 2009 || Catalina || CSS || — || align=right | 1.2 km || 
|-id=184 bgcolor=#E9E9E9
| 483184 ||  || — || November 18, 2007 || Mount Lemmon || Mount Lemmon Survey || — || align=right | 1.1 km || 
|-id=185 bgcolor=#E9E9E9
| 483185 ||  || — || November 2, 2007 || Kitt Peak || Spacewatch || — || align=right | 2.0 km || 
|-id=186 bgcolor=#E9E9E9
| 483186 ||  || — || February 2, 2009 || Kitt Peak || Spacewatch || — || align=right | 1.7 km || 
|-id=187 bgcolor=#fefefe
| 483187 ||  || — || February 18, 2010 || Mount Lemmon || Mount Lemmon Survey || — || align=right data-sort-value="0.98" | 980 m || 
|-id=188 bgcolor=#d6d6d6
| 483188 ||  || — || July 21, 2010 || WISE || WISE || — || align=right | 2.5 km || 
|-id=189 bgcolor=#E9E9E9
| 483189 ||  || — || October 18, 2007 || Kitt Peak || Spacewatch || — || align=right | 1.3 km || 
|-id=190 bgcolor=#fefefe
| 483190 ||  || — || February 26, 2007 || Mount Lemmon || Mount Lemmon Survey || NYS || align=right data-sort-value="0.71" | 710 m || 
|-id=191 bgcolor=#E9E9E9
| 483191 ||  || — || August 3, 2010 || WISE || WISE || — || align=right | 2.4 km || 
|-id=192 bgcolor=#d6d6d6
| 483192 ||  || — || November 8, 2010 || Mount Lemmon || Mount Lemmon Survey || — || align=right | 2.5 km || 
|-id=193 bgcolor=#E9E9E9
| 483193 ||  || — || May 16, 2005 || Kitt Peak || Spacewatch || — || align=right | 2.4 km || 
|-id=194 bgcolor=#E9E9E9
| 483194 ||  || — || May 12, 2010 || Mount Lemmon || Mount Lemmon Survey || MAR || align=right data-sort-value="0.98" | 980 m || 
|-id=195 bgcolor=#d6d6d6
| 483195 ||  || — || March 27, 2004 || Kitt Peak || Spacewatch || — || align=right | 2.7 km || 
|-id=196 bgcolor=#d6d6d6
| 483196 ||  || — || July 14, 2009 || Kitt Peak || Spacewatch || — || align=right | 4.5 km || 
|-id=197 bgcolor=#fefefe
| 483197 ||  || — || December 18, 2009 || Kitt Peak || Spacewatch || — || align=right data-sort-value="0.85" | 850 m || 
|-id=198 bgcolor=#d6d6d6
| 483198 ||  || — || October 7, 2005 || Kitt Peak || Spacewatch || — || align=right | 2.6 km || 
|-id=199 bgcolor=#d6d6d6
| 483199 ||  || — || December 16, 2011 || Mount Lemmon || Mount Lemmon Survey || — || align=right | 4.4 km || 
|-id=200 bgcolor=#E9E9E9
| 483200 ||  || — || December 15, 2007 || Kitt Peak || Spacewatch || — || align=right | 1.3 km || 
|}

483201–483300 

|-bgcolor=#d6d6d6
| 483201 ||  || — || February 11, 2008 || Mount Lemmon || Mount Lemmon Survey || — || align=right | 3.6 km || 
|-id=202 bgcolor=#d6d6d6
| 483202 ||  || — || April 28, 2003 || Kitt Peak || Spacewatch || — || align=right | 2.9 km || 
|-id=203 bgcolor=#d6d6d6
| 483203 ||  || — || December 30, 2011 || Kitt Peak || Spacewatch || VER || align=right | 2.3 km || 
|-id=204 bgcolor=#d6d6d6
| 483204 ||  || — || January 15, 2010 || WISE || WISE || SYL7:4 || align=right | 4.3 km || 
|-id=205 bgcolor=#fefefe
| 483205 ||  || — || January 31, 2006 || Kitt Peak || Spacewatch || — || align=right data-sort-value="0.85" | 850 m || 
|-id=206 bgcolor=#d6d6d6
| 483206 ||  || — || May 4, 2005 || Kitt Peak || Spacewatch || — || align=right | 2.0 km || 
|-id=207 bgcolor=#E9E9E9
| 483207 ||  || — || April 2, 2009 || Mount Lemmon || Mount Lemmon Survey || — || align=right | 2.7 km || 
|-id=208 bgcolor=#d6d6d6
| 483208 ||  || — || July 7, 2010 || WISE || WISE || — || align=right | 3.5 km || 
|-id=209 bgcolor=#E9E9E9
| 483209 ||  || — || January 27, 2004 || Kitt Peak || Spacewatch || — || align=right | 1.8 km || 
|-id=210 bgcolor=#fefefe
| 483210 ||  || — || February 23, 2006 || Kitt Peak || Spacewatch || H || align=right data-sort-value="0.54" | 540 m || 
|-id=211 bgcolor=#d6d6d6
| 483211 ||  || — || July 29, 2009 || Catalina || CSS || — || align=right | 4.3 km || 
|-id=212 bgcolor=#d6d6d6
| 483212 ||  || — || September 7, 2004 || Kitt Peak || Spacewatch || — || align=right | 2.9 km || 
|-id=213 bgcolor=#E9E9E9
| 483213 ||  || — || December 4, 2007 || Mount Lemmon || Mount Lemmon Survey || — || align=right | 2.3 km || 
|-id=214 bgcolor=#d6d6d6
| 483214 ||  || — || July 28, 2010 || WISE || WISE || — || align=right | 3.9 km || 
|-id=215 bgcolor=#fefefe
| 483215 ||  || — || April 22, 2007 || Kitt Peak || Spacewatch || — || align=right data-sort-value="0.77" | 770 m || 
|-id=216 bgcolor=#d6d6d6
| 483216 ||  || — || September 7, 2004 || Kitt Peak || Spacewatch || — || align=right | 2.9 km || 
|-id=217 bgcolor=#d6d6d6
| 483217 ||  || — || July 17, 2010 || WISE || WISE || — || align=right | 2.8 km || 
|-id=218 bgcolor=#E9E9E9
| 483218 ||  || — || September 28, 2011 || Mount Lemmon || Mount Lemmon Survey || — || align=right | 2.0 km || 
|-id=219 bgcolor=#E9E9E9
| 483219 ||  || — || February 12, 2008 || Mount Lemmon || Mount Lemmon Survey || — || align=right | 2.9 km || 
|-id=220 bgcolor=#d6d6d6
| 483220 ||  || — || February 9, 2007 || Kitt Peak || Spacewatch || — || align=right | 3.7 km || 
|-id=221 bgcolor=#d6d6d6
| 483221 ||  || — || March 14, 2007 || Kitt Peak || Spacewatch || — || align=right | 3.7 km || 
|-id=222 bgcolor=#d6d6d6
| 483222 ||  || — || February 23, 2001 || Kitt Peak || Spacewatch || — || align=right | 2.8 km || 
|-id=223 bgcolor=#d6d6d6
| 483223 ||  || — || March 13, 2007 || Mount Lemmon || Mount Lemmon Survey || — || align=right | 2.5 km || 
|-id=224 bgcolor=#E9E9E9
| 483224 ||  || — || September 25, 2006 || Kitt Peak || Spacewatch || AGN || align=right | 1.1 km || 
|-id=225 bgcolor=#fefefe
| 483225 ||  || — || January 19, 1996 || Kitt Peak || Spacewatch || — || align=right | 1.7 km || 
|-id=226 bgcolor=#E9E9E9
| 483226 ||  || — || September 17, 2006 || Catalina || CSS || WIT || align=right data-sort-value="0.96" | 960 m || 
|-id=227 bgcolor=#d6d6d6
| 483227 ||  || — || April 15, 2007 || Kitt Peak || Spacewatch || — || align=right | 2.9 km || 
|-id=228 bgcolor=#E9E9E9
| 483228 ||  || — || April 5, 2000 || Kitt Peak || Spacewatch || — || align=right | 1.2 km || 
|-id=229 bgcolor=#d6d6d6
| 483229 ||  || — || August 10, 2007 || Kitt Peak || Spacewatch || 3:2 || align=right | 3.7 km || 
|-id=230 bgcolor=#d6d6d6
| 483230 ||  || — || November 5, 2005 || Kitt Peak || Spacewatch || — || align=right | 2.2 km || 
|-id=231 bgcolor=#d6d6d6
| 483231 ||  || — || November 7, 2010 || Mount Lemmon || Mount Lemmon Survey || — || align=right | 2.3 km || 
|-id=232 bgcolor=#d6d6d6
| 483232 ||  || — || August 30, 2005 || Kitt Peak || Spacewatch || KOR || align=right | 1.3 km || 
|-id=233 bgcolor=#d6d6d6
| 483233 ||  || — || September 11, 2004 || Socorro || LINEAR || — || align=right | 2.4 km || 
|-id=234 bgcolor=#d6d6d6
| 483234 ||  || — || December 11, 2004 || Catalina || CSS || — || align=right | 3.6 km || 
|-id=235 bgcolor=#d6d6d6
| 483235 ||  || — || October 9, 2010 || Catalina || CSS || EOS || align=right | 2.0 km || 
|-id=236 bgcolor=#d6d6d6
| 483236 ||  || — || September 11, 2004 || Kitt Peak || Spacewatch || — || align=right | 2.9 km || 
|-id=237 bgcolor=#fefefe
| 483237 ||  || — || November 10, 2004 || Kitt Peak || Spacewatch || — || align=right | 1.0 km || 
|-id=238 bgcolor=#d6d6d6
| 483238 ||  || — || January 20, 2010 || WISE || WISE || ULA7:4 || align=right | 5.7 km || 
|-id=239 bgcolor=#d6d6d6
| 483239 ||  || — || September 11, 2004 || Kitt Peak || Spacewatch || — || align=right | 3.4 km || 
|-id=240 bgcolor=#d6d6d6
| 483240 ||  || — || August 20, 2004 || Kitt Peak || Spacewatch || EOS || align=right | 2.0 km || 
|-id=241 bgcolor=#E9E9E9
| 483241 ||  || — || December 17, 1999 || Kitt Peak || Spacewatch || — || align=right | 1.4 km || 
|-id=242 bgcolor=#fefefe
| 483242 ||  || — || December 1, 2005 || Mount Lemmon || Mount Lemmon Survey || — || align=right data-sort-value="0.82" | 820 m || 
|-id=243 bgcolor=#d6d6d6
| 483243 ||  || — || January 30, 2006 || Kitt Peak || Spacewatch || — || align=right | 2.5 km || 
|-id=244 bgcolor=#d6d6d6
| 483244 ||  || — || September 17, 2010 || Mount Lemmon || Mount Lemmon Survey || — || align=right | 2.7 km || 
|-id=245 bgcolor=#E9E9E9
| 483245 ||  || — || October 31, 2006 || Kitt Peak || Spacewatch || MRX || align=right | 1.0 km || 
|-id=246 bgcolor=#d6d6d6
| 483246 ||  || — || January 14, 2002 || Socorro || LINEAR || — || align=right | 2.7 km || 
|-id=247 bgcolor=#d6d6d6
| 483247 ||  || — || October 17, 2010 || Mount Lemmon || Mount Lemmon Survey || — || align=right | 3.1 km || 
|-id=248 bgcolor=#d6d6d6
| 483248 ||  || — || June 9, 2007 || Kitt Peak || Spacewatch || 7:4 || align=right | 4.2 km || 
|-id=249 bgcolor=#d6d6d6
| 483249 ||  || — || November 16, 2010 || Mount Lemmon || Mount Lemmon Survey || — || align=right | 3.4 km || 
|-id=250 bgcolor=#d6d6d6
| 483250 ||  || — || May 24, 2004 || Kitt Peak || Spacewatch || — || align=right | 2.9 km || 
|-id=251 bgcolor=#d6d6d6
| 483251 ||  || — || September 15, 2004 || Socorro || LINEAR || — || align=right | 4.6 km || 
|-id=252 bgcolor=#d6d6d6
| 483252 ||  || — || February 24, 2006 || Mount Lemmon || Mount Lemmon Survey || — || align=right | 3.7 km || 
|-id=253 bgcolor=#d6d6d6
| 483253 ||  || — || March 9, 2007 || Kitt Peak || Spacewatch || — || align=right | 2.4 km || 
|-id=254 bgcolor=#d6d6d6
| 483254 ||  || — || February 27, 2007 || Kitt Peak || Spacewatch || — || align=right | 3.3 km || 
|-id=255 bgcolor=#d6d6d6
| 483255 ||  || — || December 31, 2005 || Kitt Peak || Spacewatch || EOS || align=right | 2.3 km || 
|-id=256 bgcolor=#d6d6d6
| 483256 ||  || — || September 16, 2010 || Mount Lemmon || Mount Lemmon Survey || EOS || align=right | 2.1 km || 
|-id=257 bgcolor=#d6d6d6
| 483257 ||  || — || March 3, 2006 || Kitt Peak || Spacewatch || — || align=right | 2.4 km || 
|-id=258 bgcolor=#E9E9E9
| 483258 ||  || — || March 23, 2004 || Socorro || LINEAR || — || align=right | 3.1 km || 
|-id=259 bgcolor=#d6d6d6
| 483259 ||  || — || October 11, 2004 || Kitt Peak || Spacewatch || — || align=right | 2.7 km || 
|-id=260 bgcolor=#d6d6d6
| 483260 ||  || — || September 18, 2003 || Kitt Peak || Spacewatch || — || align=right | 2.9 km || 
|-id=261 bgcolor=#d6d6d6
| 483261 ||  || — || March 22, 2012 || Catalina || CSS || — || align=right | 3.9 km || 
|-id=262 bgcolor=#d6d6d6
| 483262 ||  || — || March 12, 2007 || Catalina || CSS || EMA || align=right | 3.8 km || 
|-id=263 bgcolor=#d6d6d6
| 483263 ||  || — || September 27, 2009 || Mount Lemmon || Mount Lemmon Survey || — || align=right | 3.1 km || 
|-id=264 bgcolor=#E9E9E9
| 483264 ||  || — || September 26, 2011 || Kitt Peak || Spacewatch || — || align=right | 1.5 km || 
|-id=265 bgcolor=#fefefe
| 483265 ||  || — || April 2, 2002 || Kitt Peak || Spacewatch || MAS || align=right data-sort-value="0.82" | 820 m || 
|-id=266 bgcolor=#d6d6d6
| 483266 ||  || — || September 17, 2009 || Mount Lemmon || Mount Lemmon Survey || — || align=right | 2.7 km || 
|-id=267 bgcolor=#E9E9E9
| 483267 ||  || — || July 28, 2006 || Siding Spring || SSS || — || align=right | 2.9 km || 
|-id=268 bgcolor=#d6d6d6
| 483268 ||  || — || September 30, 2005 || Mount Lemmon || Mount Lemmon Survey || — || align=right | 2.6 km || 
|-id=269 bgcolor=#d6d6d6
| 483269 ||  || — || October 27, 2005 || Kitt Peak || Spacewatch || — || align=right | 2.5 km || 
|-id=270 bgcolor=#E9E9E9
| 483270 ||  || — || September 27, 2011 || Mount Lemmon || Mount Lemmon Survey || — || align=right | 1.4 km || 
|-id=271 bgcolor=#E9E9E9
| 483271 ||  || — || October 23, 2006 || Catalina || CSS || — || align=right | 2.9 km || 
|-id=272 bgcolor=#d6d6d6
| 483272 ||  || — || August 27, 2004 || Anderson Mesa || LONEOS || — || align=right | 3.3 km || 
|-id=273 bgcolor=#d6d6d6
| 483273 ||  || — || July 28, 2009 || Kitt Peak || Spacewatch || — || align=right | 3.5 km || 
|-id=274 bgcolor=#d6d6d6
| 483274 ||  || — || November 10, 2004 || Kitt Peak || Spacewatch || THM || align=right | 1.8 km || 
|-id=275 bgcolor=#E9E9E9
| 483275 ||  || — || April 4, 2014 || Kitt Peak || Spacewatch || EUN || align=right | 1.1 km || 
|-id=276 bgcolor=#d6d6d6
| 483276 ||  || — || October 23, 2004 || Kitt Peak || Spacewatch || LIX || align=right | 3.0 km || 
|-id=277 bgcolor=#d6d6d6
| 483277 ||  || — || February 17, 2001 || Kitt Peak || Spacewatch || EOS || align=right | 2.1 km || 
|-id=278 bgcolor=#d6d6d6
| 483278 ||  || — || October 7, 2004 || Kitt Peak || Spacewatch || — || align=right | 2.4 km || 
|-id=279 bgcolor=#E9E9E9
| 483279 ||  || — || April 22, 2009 || Mount Lemmon || Mount Lemmon Survey || — || align=right | 1.4 km || 
|-id=280 bgcolor=#d6d6d6
| 483280 ||  || — || March 20, 2007 || Mount Lemmon || Mount Lemmon Survey || — || align=right | 3.0 km || 
|-id=281 bgcolor=#d6d6d6
| 483281 ||  || — || November 1, 2010 || Mount Lemmon || Mount Lemmon Survey || EOS || align=right | 1.5 km || 
|-id=282 bgcolor=#d6d6d6
| 483282 ||  || — || November 10, 1996 || Kitt Peak || Spacewatch || — || align=right | 2.1 km || 
|-id=283 bgcolor=#E9E9E9
| 483283 ||  || — || December 30, 2007 || Kitt Peak || Spacewatch || — || align=right | 2.3 km || 
|-id=284 bgcolor=#d6d6d6
| 483284 ||  || — || February 17, 2013 || Kitt Peak || Spacewatch || — || align=right | 2.5 km || 
|-id=285 bgcolor=#d6d6d6
| 483285 ||  || — || October 19, 2007 || Mount Lemmon || Mount Lemmon Survey || criticalTj (2.95) || align=right | 3.7 km || 
|-id=286 bgcolor=#d6d6d6
| 483286 ||  || — || September 21, 2009 || Catalina || CSS || — || align=right | 4.5 km || 
|-id=287 bgcolor=#d6d6d6
| 483287 ||  || — || October 12, 1999 || Kitt Peak || Spacewatch || — || align=right | 2.6 km || 
|-id=288 bgcolor=#fefefe
| 483288 ||  || — || March 27, 2003 || Kitt Peak || Spacewatch || NYS || align=right data-sort-value="0.62" | 620 m || 
|-id=289 bgcolor=#d6d6d6
| 483289 ||  || — || October 11, 2004 || Kitt Peak || Spacewatch || — || align=right | 2.5 km || 
|-id=290 bgcolor=#d6d6d6
| 483290 ||  || — || April 1, 2008 || Mount Lemmon || Mount Lemmon Survey || — || align=right | 6.2 km || 
|-id=291 bgcolor=#d6d6d6
| 483291 ||  || — || January 25, 2006 || Kitt Peak || Spacewatch || — || align=right | 2.3 km || 
|-id=292 bgcolor=#E9E9E9
| 483292 ||  || — || May 3, 2010 || WISE || WISE || — || align=right | 2.5 km || 
|-id=293 bgcolor=#d6d6d6
| 483293 ||  || — || February 21, 2006 || Mount Lemmon || Mount Lemmon Survey || — || align=right | 2.9 km || 
|-id=294 bgcolor=#E9E9E9
| 483294 ||  || — || March 20, 2004 || Kitt Peak || Spacewatch || — || align=right | 1.9 km || 
|-id=295 bgcolor=#d6d6d6
| 483295 ||  || — || September 11, 2005 || Kitt Peak || Spacewatch || KOR || align=right | 1.2 km || 
|-id=296 bgcolor=#d6d6d6
| 483296 ||  || — || December 4, 2005 || Mount Lemmon || Mount Lemmon Survey || — || align=right | 2.1 km || 
|-id=297 bgcolor=#E9E9E9
| 483297 ||  || — || September 30, 2006 || Mount Lemmon || Mount Lemmon Survey || AST || align=right | 1.5 km || 
|-id=298 bgcolor=#fefefe
| 483298 ||  || — || February 7, 2002 || Socorro || LINEAR || MAS || align=right data-sort-value="0.76" | 760 m || 
|-id=299 bgcolor=#d6d6d6
| 483299 ||  || — || September 16, 2009 || Mount Lemmon || Mount Lemmon Survey || — || align=right | 3.0 km || 
|-id=300 bgcolor=#d6d6d6
| 483300 ||  || — || March 26, 2008 || Mount Lemmon || Mount Lemmon Survey || KOR || align=right | 1.4 km || 
|}

483301–483400 

|-bgcolor=#d6d6d6
| 483301 ||  || — || February 25, 2007 || Mount Lemmon || Mount Lemmon Survey || EOS || align=right | 2.0 km || 
|-id=302 bgcolor=#d6d6d6
| 483302 ||  || — || February 25, 2012 || Kitt Peak || Spacewatch || EMA || align=right | 2.5 km || 
|-id=303 bgcolor=#d6d6d6
| 483303 ||  || — || February 25, 2007 || Mount Lemmon || Mount Lemmon Survey || EOS || align=right | 2.0 km || 
|-id=304 bgcolor=#d6d6d6
| 483304 ||  || — || October 30, 2005 || Kitt Peak || Spacewatch || — || align=right | 3.1 km || 
|-id=305 bgcolor=#d6d6d6
| 483305 ||  || — || December 7, 1999 || Kitt Peak || Spacewatch || — || align=right | 2.6 km || 
|-id=306 bgcolor=#d6d6d6
| 483306 ||  || — || January 26, 2006 || Kitt Peak || Spacewatch || — || align=right | 3.2 km || 
|-id=307 bgcolor=#E9E9E9
| 483307 ||  || — || October 19, 2007 || Catalina || CSS || — || align=right | 1.0 km || 
|-id=308 bgcolor=#E9E9E9
| 483308 ||  || — || September 25, 2007 || Mount Lemmon || Mount Lemmon Survey || — || align=right | 1.1 km || 
|-id=309 bgcolor=#d6d6d6
| 483309 ||  || — || September 16, 2009 || Catalina || CSS || — || align=right | 2.9 km || 
|-id=310 bgcolor=#d6d6d6
| 483310 ||  || — || September 30, 1998 || Kitt Peak || Spacewatch || — || align=right | 3.6 km || 
|-id=311 bgcolor=#fefefe
| 483311 ||  || — || November 10, 2004 || Kitt Peak || Spacewatch || — || align=right | 1.2 km || 
|-id=312 bgcolor=#d6d6d6
| 483312 ||  || — || March 11, 2007 || Mount Lemmon || Mount Lemmon Survey || — || align=right | 3.5 km || 
|-id=313 bgcolor=#d6d6d6
| 483313 ||  || — || September 18, 2009 || Kitt Peak || Spacewatch || — || align=right | 2.8 km || 
|-id=314 bgcolor=#d6d6d6
| 483314 ||  || — || December 21, 2005 || Kitt Peak || Spacewatch || — || align=right | 3.6 km || 
|-id=315 bgcolor=#d6d6d6
| 483315 ||  || — || April 13, 2008 || Mount Lemmon || Mount Lemmon Survey || — || align=right | 3.5 km || 
|-id=316 bgcolor=#d6d6d6
| 483316 ||  || — || September 27, 2003 || Kitt Peak || Spacewatch || — || align=right | 3.0 km || 
|-id=317 bgcolor=#d6d6d6
| 483317 ||  || — || September 14, 2009 || Catalina || CSS || — || align=right | 3.1 km || 
|-id=318 bgcolor=#d6d6d6
| 483318 ||  || — || April 22, 2007 || Kitt Peak || Spacewatch || — || align=right | 3.9 km || 
|-id=319 bgcolor=#d6d6d6
| 483319 ||  || — || May 7, 2003 || Catalina || CSS || — || align=right | 4.0 km || 
|-id=320 bgcolor=#fefefe
| 483320 ||  || — || October 22, 2006 || Mount Lemmon || Mount Lemmon Survey || — || align=right | 1.2 km || 
|-id=321 bgcolor=#d6d6d6
| 483321 ||  || — || September 1, 2005 || Anderson Mesa || LONEOS || — || align=right | 4.1 km || 
|-id=322 bgcolor=#d6d6d6
| 483322 ||  || — || July 29, 2005 || Siding Spring || SSS || — || align=right | 3.1 km || 
|-id=323 bgcolor=#fefefe
| 483323 ||  || — || April 1, 2008 || Kitt Peak || Spacewatch || ERI || align=right | 2.8 km || 
|-id=324 bgcolor=#FA8072
| 483324 ||  || — || December 15, 2006 || Kitt Peak || Spacewatch || H || align=right data-sort-value="0.64" | 640 m || 
|-id=325 bgcolor=#fefefe
| 483325 ||  || — || September 28, 2006 || Catalina || CSS || — || align=right data-sort-value="0.86" | 860 m || 
|-id=326 bgcolor=#E9E9E9
| 483326 ||  || — || October 23, 2003 || Kitt Peak || Spacewatch || — || align=right | 4.2 km || 
|-id=327 bgcolor=#E9E9E9
| 483327 ||  || — || December 25, 2013 || Mount Lemmon || Mount Lemmon Survey || — || align=right | 1.7 km || 
|-id=328 bgcolor=#d6d6d6
| 483328 ||  || — || August 30, 2005 || Kitt Peak || Spacewatch || EOS || align=right | 2.0 km || 
|-id=329 bgcolor=#fefefe
| 483329 ||  || — || July 30, 2005 || Campo Imperatore || CINEOS || — || align=right data-sort-value="0.81" | 810 m || 
|-id=330 bgcolor=#fefefe
| 483330 ||  || — || November 17, 2006 || Kitt Peak || Spacewatch || — || align=right | 1.1 km || 
|-id=331 bgcolor=#fefefe
| 483331 ||  || — || September 16, 2006 || Catalina || CSS || — || align=right data-sort-value="0.72" | 720 m || 
|-id=332 bgcolor=#d6d6d6
| 483332 ||  || — || March 2, 2008 || Mount Lemmon || Mount Lemmon Survey || — || align=right | 3.5 km || 
|-id=333 bgcolor=#d6d6d6
| 483333 ||  || — || June 1, 2010 || WISE || WISE || — || align=right | 4.7 km || 
|-id=334 bgcolor=#E9E9E9
| 483334 ||  || — || September 10, 2004 || Socorro || LINEAR || — || align=right | 1.4 km || 
|-id=335 bgcolor=#fefefe
| 483335 ||  || — || February 25, 2011 || Kitt Peak || Spacewatch || — || align=right | 1.5 km || 
|-id=336 bgcolor=#d6d6d6
| 483336 ||  || — || December 13, 2006 || Mount Lemmon || Mount Lemmon Survey || HYG || align=right | 2.8 km || 
|-id=337 bgcolor=#fefefe
| 483337 ||  || — || October 27, 2006 || Kitt Peak || Spacewatch || V || align=right data-sort-value="0.86" | 860 m || 
|-id=338 bgcolor=#E9E9E9
| 483338 ||  || — || October 8, 2007 || Catalina || CSS || — || align=right | 2.7 km || 
|-id=339 bgcolor=#d6d6d6
| 483339 ||  || — || May 24, 2010 || WISE || WISE || — || align=right | 3.3 km || 
|-id=340 bgcolor=#d6d6d6
| 483340 ||  || — || March 31, 2010 || WISE || WISE || — || align=right | 3.8 km || 
|-id=341 bgcolor=#d6d6d6
| 483341 ||  || — || June 20, 1999 || Kitt Peak || Spacewatch || — || align=right | 3.4 km || 
|-id=342 bgcolor=#d6d6d6
| 483342 ||  || — || June 13, 2005 || Mount Lemmon || Mount Lemmon Survey || (1118) || align=right | 4.3 km || 
|-id=343 bgcolor=#fefefe
| 483343 ||  || — || October 6, 1999 || Socorro || LINEAR || — || align=right data-sort-value="0.67" | 670 m || 
|-id=344 bgcolor=#d6d6d6
| 483344 ||  || — || September 25, 1995 || Kitt Peak || Spacewatch || — || align=right | 3.8 km || 
|-id=345 bgcolor=#d6d6d6
| 483345 ||  || — || December 22, 2006 || Kitt Peak || Spacewatch || — || align=right | 3.4 km || 
|-id=346 bgcolor=#E9E9E9
| 483346 ||  || — || October 9, 2007 || Kitt Peak || Spacewatch || — || align=right | 2.3 km || 
|-id=347 bgcolor=#E9E9E9
| 483347 ||  || — || December 1, 2005 || Mount Lemmon || Mount Lemmon Survey || EUN || align=right | 1.5 km || 
|-id=348 bgcolor=#d6d6d6
| 483348 ||  || — || November 2, 2011 || Mount Lemmon || Mount Lemmon Survey || — || align=right | 3.1 km || 
|-id=349 bgcolor=#d6d6d6
| 483349 ||  || — || August 31, 2005 || Anderson Mesa || LONEOS || — || align=right | 4.0 km || 
|-id=350 bgcolor=#fefefe
| 483350 ||  || — || August 27, 2006 || Anderson Mesa || LONEOS || — || align=right data-sort-value="0.71" | 710 m || 
|-id=351 bgcolor=#fefefe
| 483351 ||  || — || March 18, 2004 || Siding Spring || SSS || H || align=right | 1.2 km || 
|-id=352 bgcolor=#fefefe
| 483352 ||  || — || March 1, 2011 || Mount Lemmon || Mount Lemmon Survey || — || align=right data-sort-value="0.94" | 940 m || 
|-id=353 bgcolor=#E9E9E9
| 483353 ||  || — || July 10, 2007 || Siding Spring || SSS || — || align=right | 1.7 km || 
|-id=354 bgcolor=#fefefe
| 483354 ||  || — || July 25, 2008 || Siding Spring || SSS || V || align=right data-sort-value="0.80" | 800 m || 
|-id=355 bgcolor=#E9E9E9
| 483355 ||  || — || September 16, 2012 || Catalina || CSS || — || align=right data-sort-value="0.94" | 940 m || 
|-id=356 bgcolor=#fefefe
| 483356 ||  || — || October 16, 2009 || Catalina || CSS || — || align=right data-sort-value="0.92" | 920 m || 
|-id=357 bgcolor=#d6d6d6
| 483357 ||  || — || November 18, 2006 || Kitt Peak || Spacewatch || — || align=right | 3.4 km || 
|-id=358 bgcolor=#fefefe
| 483358 ||  || — || March 28, 2008 || Mount Lemmon || Mount Lemmon Survey || — || align=right data-sort-value="0.78" | 780 m || 
|-id=359 bgcolor=#E9E9E9
| 483359 ||  || — || May 9, 2002 || Socorro || LINEAR || — || align=right | 2.1 km || 
|-id=360 bgcolor=#E9E9E9
| 483360 ||  || — || November 21, 2008 || Mount Lemmon || Mount Lemmon Survey || (5) || align=right data-sort-value="0.63" | 630 m || 
|-id=361 bgcolor=#d6d6d6
| 483361 ||  || — || November 8, 2007 || Kitt Peak || Spacewatch || KOR || align=right | 1.4 km || 
|-id=362 bgcolor=#fefefe
| 483362 ||  || — || September 20, 2006 || Anderson Mesa || LONEOS || — || align=right data-sort-value="0.82" | 820 m || 
|-id=363 bgcolor=#fefefe
| 483363 ||  || — || November 20, 1995 || Kitt Peak || Spacewatch || — || align=right data-sort-value="0.64" | 640 m || 
|-id=364 bgcolor=#fefefe
| 483364 ||  || — || December 21, 2003 || Socorro || LINEAR || H || align=right data-sort-value="0.52" | 520 m || 
|-id=365 bgcolor=#fefefe
| 483365 ||  || — || January 8, 2006 || Mount Lemmon || Mount Lemmon Survey || — || align=right data-sort-value="0.75" | 750 m || 
|-id=366 bgcolor=#d6d6d6
| 483366 ||  || — || October 23, 2009 || Kitt Peak || Spacewatch || 3:2 || align=right | 5.3 km || 
|-id=367 bgcolor=#E9E9E9
| 483367 ||  || — || November 5, 2007 || Mount Lemmon || Mount Lemmon Survey || — || align=right | 2.1 km || 
|-id=368 bgcolor=#fefefe
| 483368 ||  || — || May 8, 2006 || Mount Lemmon || Mount Lemmon Survey || — || align=right data-sort-value="0.68" | 680 m || 
|-id=369 bgcolor=#fefefe
| 483369 ||  || — || January 23, 2006 || Catalina || CSS || — || align=right | 1.1 km || 
|-id=370 bgcolor=#fefefe
| 483370 ||  || — || August 25, 2012 || Mount Lemmon || Mount Lemmon Survey || — || align=right | 1.00 km || 
|-id=371 bgcolor=#E9E9E9
| 483371 ||  || — || January 7, 1999 || Kitt Peak || Spacewatch || — || align=right | 2.8 km || 
|-id=372 bgcolor=#E9E9E9
| 483372 ||  || — || October 4, 2007 || Kitt Peak || Spacewatch || — || align=right | 1.5 km || 
|-id=373 bgcolor=#fefefe
| 483373 ||  || — || January 8, 2010 || Kitt Peak || Spacewatch || — || align=right data-sort-value="0.83" | 830 m || 
|-id=374 bgcolor=#d6d6d6
| 483374 ||  || — || June 30, 2005 || Kitt Peak || Spacewatch || critical || align=right | 2.3 km || 
|-id=375 bgcolor=#d6d6d6
| 483375 ||  || — || September 29, 2005 || Catalina || CSS || — || align=right | 2.7 km || 
|-id=376 bgcolor=#fefefe
| 483376 ||  || — || September 28, 2008 || Mount Lemmon || Mount Lemmon Survey || Hcritical || align=right data-sort-value="0.57" | 570 m || 
|-id=377 bgcolor=#d6d6d6
| 483377 ||  || — || October 25, 2005 || Kitt Peak || Spacewatch || LIX || align=right | 3.3 km || 
|-id=378 bgcolor=#d6d6d6
| 483378 ||  || — || July 2, 2010 || WISE || WISE || — || align=right | 2.5 km || 
|-id=379 bgcolor=#d6d6d6
| 483379 ||  || — || March 13, 2007 || Kitt Peak || Spacewatch || — || align=right | 3.4 km || 
|-id=380 bgcolor=#d6d6d6
| 483380 ||  || — || October 23, 2005 || Catalina || CSS || — || align=right | 3.2 km || 
|-id=381 bgcolor=#d6d6d6
| 483381 ||  || — || February 18, 2008 || Mount Lemmon || Mount Lemmon Survey || — || align=right | 4.4 km || 
|-id=382 bgcolor=#E9E9E9
| 483382 ||  || — || February 18, 2010 || Mount Lemmon || Mount Lemmon Survey || — || align=right | 1.8 km || 
|-id=383 bgcolor=#fefefe
| 483383 ||  || — || December 17, 2009 || Mount Lemmon || Mount Lemmon Survey || — || align=right data-sort-value="0.93" | 930 m || 
|-id=384 bgcolor=#fefefe
| 483384 ||  || — || December 14, 2007 || Mount Lemmon || Mount Lemmon Survey || — || align=right data-sort-value="0.86" | 860 m || 
|-id=385 bgcolor=#E9E9E9
| 483385 ||  || — || March 13, 2010 || Kitt Peak || Spacewatch || EUN || align=right | 1.0 km || 
|-id=386 bgcolor=#d6d6d6
| 483386 ||  || — || April 6, 2008 || Kitt Peak || Spacewatch || — || align=right | 2.7 km || 
|-id=387 bgcolor=#E9E9E9
| 483387 ||  || — || October 29, 2008 || Mount Lemmon || Mount Lemmon Survey || MAR || align=right data-sort-value="0.97" | 970 m || 
|-id=388 bgcolor=#FA8072
| 483388 ||  || — || October 10, 1999 || Socorro || LINEAR || H || align=right data-sort-value="0.81" | 810 m || 
|-id=389 bgcolor=#E9E9E9
| 483389 ||  || — || November 3, 2008 || Kitt Peak || Spacewatch || — || align=right data-sort-value="0.82" | 820 m || 
|-id=390 bgcolor=#fefefe
| 483390 ||  || — || October 16, 1977 || Palomar || PLS || — || align=right data-sort-value="0.75" | 750 m || 
|-id=391 bgcolor=#fefefe
| 483391 ||  || — || October 6, 1991 || Palomar || A. Lowe || — || align=right data-sort-value="0.71" | 710 m || 
|-id=392 bgcolor=#d6d6d6
| 483392 ||  || — || September 12, 1994 || Kitt Peak || Spacewatch || — || align=right | 2.2 km || 
|-id=393 bgcolor=#d6d6d6
| 483393 ||  || — || September 28, 1994 || Kitt Peak || Spacewatch || — || align=right | 2.1 km || 
|-id=394 bgcolor=#fefefe
| 483394 ||  || — || February 1, 1995 || Kitt Peak || Spacewatch || critical || align=right data-sort-value="0.52" | 520 m || 
|-id=395 bgcolor=#fefefe
| 483395 ||  || — || March 27, 1995 || Kitt Peak || Spacewatch || NYS || align=right data-sort-value="0.50" | 500 m || 
|-id=396 bgcolor=#E9E9E9
| 483396 ||  || — || September 18, 1995 || Kitt Peak || Spacewatch || — || align=right data-sort-value="0.72" | 720 m || 
|-id=397 bgcolor=#fefefe
| 483397 ||  || — || September 17, 1995 || Kitt Peak || Spacewatch || — || align=right data-sort-value="0.65" | 650 m || 
|-id=398 bgcolor=#d6d6d6
| 483398 ||  || — || April 24, 1996 || Kitt Peak || Spacewatch || — || align=right | 2.2 km || 
|-id=399 bgcolor=#d6d6d6
| 483399 ||  || — || April 30, 1997 || Kitt Peak || Spacewatch || — || align=right | 2.3 km || 
|-id=400 bgcolor=#C2FFFF
| 483400 ||  || — || June 8, 1997 || La Silla || E. W. Elst || L5 || align=right | 13 km || 
|}

483401–483500 

|-bgcolor=#d6d6d6
| 483401 ||  || — || June 27, 1997 || Kitt Peak || Spacewatch || Tj (2.98) || align=right | 3.0 km || 
|-id=402 bgcolor=#d6d6d6
| 483402 ||  || — || September 21, 1998 || Kitt Peak || Spacewatch || — || align=right | 3.0 km || 
|-id=403 bgcolor=#fefefe
| 483403 ||  || — || October 13, 1998 || Kitt Peak || Spacewatch || — || align=right data-sort-value="0.62" | 620 m || 
|-id=404 bgcolor=#fefefe
| 483404 ||  || — || December 10, 1998 || Kitt Peak || Spacewatch || — || align=right data-sort-value="0.83" | 830 m || 
|-id=405 bgcolor=#E9E9E9
| 483405 ||  || — || February 7, 1999 || Cloudcroft || W. Offutt || — || align=right | 1.9 km || 
|-id=406 bgcolor=#FA8072
| 483406 ||  || — || September 8, 1999 || Socorro || LINEAR || — || align=right | 1.0 km || 
|-id=407 bgcolor=#E9E9E9
| 483407 ||  || — || September 16, 1999 || Woomera || F. B. Zoltowski || — || align=right | 1.7 km || 
|-id=408 bgcolor=#FFC2E0
| 483408 ||  || — || October 2, 1999 || Catalina || CSS || AMO || align=right data-sort-value="0.47" | 470 m || 
|-id=409 bgcolor=#fefefe
| 483409 ||  || — || October 4, 1999 || Socorro || LINEAR || — || align=right data-sort-value="0.65" | 650 m || 
|-id=410 bgcolor=#E9E9E9
| 483410 ||  || — || October 10, 1999 || Socorro || LINEAR || (5) || align=right data-sort-value="0.72" | 720 m || 
|-id=411 bgcolor=#fefefe
| 483411 ||  || — || November 2, 1999 || Kitt Peak || Spacewatch || — || align=right data-sort-value="0.59" | 590 m || 
|-id=412 bgcolor=#fefefe
| 483412 ||  || — || November 2, 1999 || Kitt Peak || Spacewatch || — || align=right data-sort-value="0.86" | 860 m || 
|-id=413 bgcolor=#FA8072
| 483413 ||  || — || October 2, 1999 || Catalina || CSS || H || align=right data-sort-value="0.71" | 710 m || 
|-id=414 bgcolor=#E9E9E9
| 483414 ||  || — || October 1, 1999 || Eskridge || Farpoint Obs. || — || align=right | 1.3 km || 
|-id=415 bgcolor=#fefefe
| 483415 ||  || — || November 9, 1999 || Kitt Peak || Spacewatch || — || align=right data-sort-value="0.62" | 620 m || 
|-id=416 bgcolor=#FA8072
| 483416 ||  || — || December 30, 1999 || Socorro || LINEAR || Tj (2.97) || align=right | 2.3 km || 
|-id=417 bgcolor=#E9E9E9
| 483417 ||  || — || December 27, 1999 || Kitt Peak || Spacewatch || — || align=right | 1.0 km || 
|-id=418 bgcolor=#E9E9E9
| 483418 ||  || — || January 30, 2000 || Kitt Peak || Spacewatch || — || align=right | 1.3 km || 
|-id=419 bgcolor=#E9E9E9
| 483419 ||  || — || January 30, 2000 || Kitt Peak || Spacewatch || — || align=right | 1.1 km || 
|-id=420 bgcolor=#FA8072
| 483420 ||  || — || January 11, 2000 || Socorro || LINEAR || — || align=right | 1.0 km || 
|-id=421 bgcolor=#E9E9E9
| 483421 ||  || — || February 3, 2000 || Socorro || LINEAR || — || align=right | 2.3 km || 
|-id=422 bgcolor=#FFC2E0
| 483422 ||  || — || February 4, 2000 || Socorro || LINEAR || APOPHA || align=right data-sort-value="0.30" | 300 m || 
|-id=423 bgcolor=#FFC2E0
| 483423 ||  || — || February 16, 2000 || Catalina || CSS || APOPHAcritical || align=right data-sort-value="0.31" | 310 m || 
|-id=424 bgcolor=#E9E9E9
| 483424 ||  || — || February 29, 2000 || Socorro || LINEAR || — || align=right | 1.5 km || 
|-id=425 bgcolor=#E9E9E9
| 483425 ||  || — || March 4, 2000 || Socorro || LINEAR || — || align=right | 2.0 km || 
|-id=426 bgcolor=#d6d6d6
| 483426 ||  || — || March 30, 2000 || Kitt Peak || Spacewatch || Tj (2.99) || align=right | 3.7 km || 
|-id=427 bgcolor=#E9E9E9
| 483427 ||  || — || March 26, 2000 || Anderson Mesa || LONEOS || — || align=right | 1.3 km || 
|-id=428 bgcolor=#E9E9E9
| 483428 ||  || — || April 25, 2000 || Kitt Peak || Spacewatch || — || align=right | 1.5 km || 
|-id=429 bgcolor=#FA8072
| 483429 ||  || — || June 11, 2000 || Anderson Mesa || LONEOS || — || align=right data-sort-value="0.75" | 750 m || 
|-id=430 bgcolor=#FA8072
| 483430 ||  || — || August 10, 2000 || Socorro || LINEAR || — || align=right data-sort-value="0.64" | 640 m || 
|-id=431 bgcolor=#FA8072
| 483431 ||  || — || January 31, 2001 || Socorro || LINEAR || H || align=right data-sort-value="0.60" | 600 m || 
|-id=432 bgcolor=#FFC2E0
| 483432 ||  || — || February 19, 2001 || Socorro || LINEAR || APOPHA || align=right data-sort-value="0.32" | 320 m || 
|-id=433 bgcolor=#d6d6d6
| 483433 ||  || — || March 21, 2001 || Kitt Peak || Spacewatch || — || align=right | 3.0 km || 
|-id=434 bgcolor=#E9E9E9
| 483434 ||  || — || April 13, 2001 || Socorro || LINEAR || — || align=right | 2.2 km || 
|-id=435 bgcolor=#d6d6d6
| 483435 ||  || — || April 25, 2001 || Anderson Mesa || LONEOS || Tj (2.94) || align=right | 2.7 km || 
|-id=436 bgcolor=#E9E9E9
| 483436 ||  || — || August 11, 2001 || Palomar || NEAT || — || align=right | 2.9 km || 
|-id=437 bgcolor=#fefefe
| 483437 ||  || — || August 16, 2001 || Socorro || LINEAR || — || align=right data-sort-value="0.71" | 710 m || 
|-id=438 bgcolor=#fefefe
| 483438 ||  || — || August 24, 2001 || Anderson Mesa || LONEOS || — || align=right data-sort-value="0.91" | 910 m || 
|-id=439 bgcolor=#fefefe
| 483439 ||  || — || August 19, 2001 || Cerro Tololo || M. W. Buie || — || align=right data-sort-value="0.57" | 570 m || 
|-id=440 bgcolor=#fefefe
| 483440 ||  || — || September 12, 2001 || Kitt Peak || M. W. Buie || NYS || align=right data-sort-value="0.50" | 500 m || 
|-id=441 bgcolor=#E9E9E9
| 483441 ||  || — || September 20, 2001 || Socorro || LINEAR || — || align=right | 1.5 km || 
|-id=442 bgcolor=#fefefe
| 483442 ||  || — || September 16, 2001 || Socorro || LINEAR || — || align=right data-sort-value="0.91" | 910 m || 
|-id=443 bgcolor=#fefefe
| 483443 ||  || — || September 19, 2001 || Socorro || LINEAR || — || align=right data-sort-value="0.75" | 750 m || 
|-id=444 bgcolor=#fefefe
| 483444 ||  || — || September 21, 2001 || Socorro || LINEAR || — || align=right data-sort-value="0.81" | 810 m || 
|-id=445 bgcolor=#fefefe
| 483445 ||  || — || September 12, 2001 || Kitt Peak || Spacewatch || — || align=right data-sort-value="0.83" | 830 m || 
|-id=446 bgcolor=#fefefe
| 483446 ||  || — || September 12, 2001 || Kitt Peak || Spacewatch || — || align=right data-sort-value="0.68" | 680 m || 
|-id=447 bgcolor=#fefefe
| 483447 ||  || — || October 10, 2001 || Palomar || NEAT || — || align=right data-sort-value="0.65" | 650 m || 
|-id=448 bgcolor=#fefefe
| 483448 ||  || — || September 21, 2001 || Socorro || LINEAR || — || align=right data-sort-value="0.85" | 850 m || 
|-id=449 bgcolor=#fefefe
| 483449 ||  || — || October 20, 2001 || Socorro || LINEAR || — || align=right data-sort-value="0.75" | 750 m || 
|-id=450 bgcolor=#fefefe
| 483450 ||  || — || November 10, 2001 || Socorro || LINEAR || — || align=right data-sort-value="0.90" | 900 m || 
|-id=451 bgcolor=#fefefe
| 483451 ||  || — || November 17, 2001 || Socorro || LINEAR || — || align=right data-sort-value="0.87" | 870 m || 
|-id=452 bgcolor=#d6d6d6
| 483452 ||  || — || December 14, 2001 || Socorro || LINEAR || — || align=right | 1.2 km || 
|-id=453 bgcolor=#FFC2E0
| 483453 ||  || — || January 8, 2002 || Socorro || LINEAR || AMO || align=right data-sort-value="0.85" | 850 m || 
|-id=454 bgcolor=#fefefe
| 483454 Hosszúkatinka ||  ||  || January 13, 2002 || Piszkéstető || K. Sárneczky, Z. Heiner || MAS || align=right data-sort-value="0.59" | 590 m || 
|-id=455 bgcolor=#fefefe
| 483455 ||  || — || February 8, 2002 || Kitt Peak || Spacewatch || MAS || align=right data-sort-value="0.67" | 670 m || 
|-id=456 bgcolor=#fefefe
| 483456 ||  || — || February 7, 2002 || Palomar || NEAT || — || align=right data-sort-value="0.75" | 750 m || 
|-id=457 bgcolor=#fefefe
| 483457 ||  || — || February 10, 2002 || Socorro || LINEAR || — || align=right data-sort-value="0.72" | 720 m || 
|-id=458 bgcolor=#fefefe
| 483458 ||  || — || February 17, 2002 || Bohyunsan || Bohyunsan Obs. || MAS || align=right data-sort-value="0.68" | 680 m || 
|-id=459 bgcolor=#FFC2E0
| 483459 ||  || — || March 12, 2002 || Socorro || LINEAR || APO || align=right data-sort-value="0.32" | 320 m || 
|-id=460 bgcolor=#fefefe
| 483460 ||  || — || March 13, 2002 || Socorro || LINEAR || — || align=right data-sort-value="0.95" | 950 m || 
|-id=461 bgcolor=#d6d6d6
| 483461 ||  || — || March 9, 2002 || Anderson Mesa || LONEOS || — || align=right | 3.9 km || 
|-id=462 bgcolor=#fefefe
| 483462 ||  || — || March 16, 2002 || Socorro || LINEAR || — || align=right data-sort-value="0.77" | 770 m || 
|-id=463 bgcolor=#fefefe
| 483463 ||  || — || March 18, 2002 || Socorro || LINEAR || (5026) || align=right data-sort-value="0.91" | 910 m || 
|-id=464 bgcolor=#fefefe
| 483464 ||  || — || March 20, 2002 || Kitt Peak || Spacewatch || — || align=right data-sort-value="0.73" | 730 m || 
|-id=465 bgcolor=#d6d6d6
| 483465 ||  || — || April 2, 2002 || Kitt Peak || Spacewatch || — || align=right | 2.9 km || 
|-id=466 bgcolor=#fefefe
| 483466 ||  || — || April 10, 2002 || Socorro || LINEAR || NYS || align=right data-sort-value="0.69" | 690 m || 
|-id=467 bgcolor=#fefefe
| 483467 ||  || — || April 10, 2002 || Socorro || LINEAR || — || align=right data-sort-value="0.94" | 940 m || 
|-id=468 bgcolor=#FFC2E0
| 483468 ||  || — || May 4, 2002 || Socorro || LINEAR || APO +1km || align=right | 1.0 km || 
|-id=469 bgcolor=#d6d6d6
| 483469 ||  || — || May 8, 2002 || Socorro || LINEAR || — || align=right | 2.8 km || 
|-id=470 bgcolor=#FA8072
| 483470 ||  || — || May 14, 2002 || Palomar || NEAT || H || align=right data-sort-value="0.65" | 650 m || 
|-id=471 bgcolor=#FFC2E0
| 483471 ||  || — || June 10, 2002 || Palomar || NEAT || APO || align=right data-sort-value="0.77" | 770 m || 
|-id=472 bgcolor=#FFC2E0
| 483472 ||  || — || July 5, 2002 || Palomar || NEAT || APO || align=right data-sort-value="0.51" | 510 m || 
|-id=473 bgcolor=#d6d6d6
| 483473 ||  || — || July 10, 2002 || Campo Imperatore || CINEOS || — || align=right | 2.9 km || 
|-id=474 bgcolor=#fefefe
| 483474 ||  || — || July 14, 2002 || Palomar || NEAT || — || align=right data-sort-value="0.58" | 580 m || 
|-id=475 bgcolor=#E9E9E9
| 483475 ||  || — || July 9, 2002 || Palomar || NEAT || MAR || align=right | 1.3 km || 
|-id=476 bgcolor=#E9E9E9
| 483476 ||  || — || August 12, 2002 || Haleakala || NEAT || EUN || align=right | 1.5 km || 
|-id=477 bgcolor=#E9E9E9
| 483477 ||  || — || August 14, 2002 || Socorro || LINEAR || (1547) || align=right | 2.0 km || 
|-id=478 bgcolor=#E9E9E9
| 483478 ||  || — || August 11, 2002 || Socorro || LINEAR || — || align=right | 1.6 km || 
|-id=479 bgcolor=#fefefe
| 483479 ||  || — || August 15, 2002 || Palomar || NEAT || H || align=right data-sort-value="0.55" | 550 m || 
|-id=480 bgcolor=#d6d6d6
| 483480 ||  || — || August 8, 2002 || Palomar || NEAT || — || align=right | 3.4 km || 
|-id=481 bgcolor=#E9E9E9
| 483481 ||  || — || August 29, 2002 || Palomar || NEAT || (5) || align=right data-sort-value="0.70" | 700 m || 
|-id=482 bgcolor=#E9E9E9
| 483482 ||  || — || September 4, 2002 || Anderson Mesa || LONEOS || EUN || align=right | 1.3 km || 
|-id=483 bgcolor=#FA8072
| 483483 ||  || — || September 6, 2002 || Socorro || LINEAR || — || align=right | 1.2 km || 
|-id=484 bgcolor=#fefefe
| 483484 ||  || — || September 5, 2002 || Socorro || LINEAR || — || align=right data-sort-value="0.62" | 620 m || 
|-id=485 bgcolor=#fefefe
| 483485 ||  || — || September 13, 2002 || Palomar || NEAT || H || align=right data-sort-value="0.61" | 610 m || 
|-id=486 bgcolor=#fefefe
| 483486 ||  || — || September 15, 2002 || Kitt Peak || Spacewatch || — || align=right data-sort-value="0.59" | 590 m || 
|-id=487 bgcolor=#E9E9E9
| 483487 ||  || — || September 14, 2002 || Palomar || NEAT || — || align=right | 1.0 km || 
|-id=488 bgcolor=#fefefe
| 483488 Wudeshi ||  ||  || September 4, 2002 || Palomar || NEAT || — || align=right data-sort-value="0.62" | 620 m || 
|-id=489 bgcolor=#fefefe
| 483489 ||  || — || August 13, 2002 || Kitt Peak || Spacewatch || — || align=right data-sort-value="0.59" | 590 m || 
|-id=490 bgcolor=#E9E9E9
| 483490 ||  || — || September 29, 2002 || Haleakala || NEAT || — || align=right | 1.5 km || 
|-id=491 bgcolor=#fefefe
| 483491 ||  || — || September 5, 2002 || Xinglong || SCAP || critical || align=right data-sort-value="0.75" | 750 m || 
|-id=492 bgcolor=#E9E9E9
| 483492 ||  || — || October 2, 2002 || Haleakala || NEAT || — || align=right | 1.4 km || 
|-id=493 bgcolor=#FA8072
| 483493 ||  || — || October 4, 2002 || Socorro || LINEAR || — || align=right data-sort-value="0.71" | 710 m || 
|-id=494 bgcolor=#E9E9E9
| 483494 ||  || — || October 4, 2002 || Socorro || LINEAR || — || align=right | 1.7 km || 
|-id=495 bgcolor=#fefefe
| 483495 ||  || — || October 5, 2002 || Socorro || LINEAR || — || align=right data-sort-value="0.90" | 900 m || 
|-id=496 bgcolor=#fefefe
| 483496 ||  || — || October 12, 2002 || Socorro || LINEAR || — || align=right data-sort-value="0.87" | 870 m || 
|-id=497 bgcolor=#fefefe
| 483497 ||  || — || October 9, 2002 || Palomar || NEAT || — || align=right | 1.5 km || 
|-id=498 bgcolor=#FA8072
| 483498 ||  || — || October 28, 2002 || Socorro || LINEAR || — || align=right | 2.8 km || 
|-id=499 bgcolor=#fefefe
| 483499 ||  || — || November 6, 2002 || Socorro || LINEAR || H || align=right data-sort-value="0.92" | 920 m || 
|-id=500 bgcolor=#fefefe
| 483500 ||  || — || October 31, 2002 || Palomar || NEAT || — || align=right data-sort-value="0.75" | 750 m || 
|}

483501–483600 

|-bgcolor=#E9E9E9
| 483501 ||  || — || November 6, 2002 || Anderson Mesa || LONEOS || — || align=right | 1.9 km || 
|-id=502 bgcolor=#FA8072
| 483502 ||  || — || November 11, 2002 || Socorro || LINEAR || — || align=right data-sort-value="0.83" | 830 m || 
|-id=503 bgcolor=#fefefe
| 483503 ||  || — || November 22, 2002 || Palomar || NEAT || H || align=right data-sort-value="0.49" | 490 m || 
|-id=504 bgcolor=#FFC2E0
| 483504 ||  || — || December 5, 2002 || Socorro || LINEAR || APO || align=right data-sort-value="0.32" | 320 m || 
|-id=505 bgcolor=#E9E9E9
| 483505 ||  || — || December 6, 2002 || Socorro || LINEAR || — || align=right | 1.9 km || 
|-id=506 bgcolor=#FFC2E0
| 483506 ||  || — || December 12, 2002 || Socorro || LINEAR || AMOcritical || align=right data-sort-value="0.74" | 740 m || 
|-id=507 bgcolor=#fefefe
| 483507 ||  || — || January 4, 2003 || Socorro || LINEAR || — || align=right data-sort-value="0.92" | 920 m || 
|-id=508 bgcolor=#FFC2E0
| 483508 ||  || — || February 2, 2003 || Socorro || LINEAR || APOPHAcritical || align=right data-sort-value="0.2" | 200 m || 
|-id=509 bgcolor=#FFC2E0
| 483509 ||  || — || February 4, 2003 || Anderson Mesa || LONEOS || AMOcritical || align=right data-sort-value="0.45" | 450 m || 
|-id=510 bgcolor=#E9E9E9
| 483510 ||  || — || February 2, 2003 || Anderson Mesa || LONEOS || — || align=right | 2.3 km || 
|-id=511 bgcolor=#fefefe
| 483511 ||  || — || March 24, 2003 || Kitt Peak || Spacewatch || — || align=right data-sort-value="0.85" | 850 m || 
|-id=512 bgcolor=#fefefe
| 483512 ||  || — || March 23, 2003 || Kitt Peak || Spacewatch || — || align=right data-sort-value="0.78" | 780 m || 
|-id=513 bgcolor=#E9E9E9
| 483513 ||  || — || March 23, 2003 || Kitt Peak || Spacewatch || — || align=right | 1.5 km || 
|-id=514 bgcolor=#fefefe
| 483514 ||  || — || March 27, 2003 || Socorro || LINEAR || H || align=right | 1.0 km || 
|-id=515 bgcolor=#fefefe
| 483515 ||  || — || March 23, 2003 || Apache Point || SDSS || — || align=right data-sort-value="0.62" | 620 m || 
|-id=516 bgcolor=#E9E9E9
| 483516 ||  || — || August 7, 2003 || Pla D'Arguines || Pla D'Arguines Obs. || — || align=right | 1.4 km || 
|-id=517 bgcolor=#fefefe
| 483517 ||  || — || August 11, 2003 || Haleakala || NEAT || — || align=right | 1.6 km || 
|-id=518 bgcolor=#E9E9E9
| 483518 ||  || — || August 22, 2003 || Palomar || NEAT || — || align=right | 1.1 km || 
|-id=519 bgcolor=#d6d6d6
| 483519 ||  || — || August 24, 2003 || Socorro || LINEAR || Tj (2.99) || align=right | 3.9 km || 
|-id=520 bgcolor=#E9E9E9
| 483520 ||  || — || September 16, 2003 || Kitt Peak || Spacewatch || (5) || align=right data-sort-value="0.62" | 620 m || 
|-id=521 bgcolor=#E9E9E9
| 483521 ||  || — || September 18, 2003 || Kitt Peak || Spacewatch || — || align=right | 1.2 km || 
|-id=522 bgcolor=#E9E9E9
| 483522 ||  || — || September 17, 2003 || Campo Imperatore || CINEOS || (5) || align=right data-sort-value="0.87" | 870 m || 
|-id=523 bgcolor=#E9E9E9
| 483523 ||  || — || September 20, 2003 || Palomar || NEAT || — || align=right | 1.0 km || 
|-id=524 bgcolor=#E9E9E9
| 483524 ||  || — || September 23, 2003 || Palomar || NEAT || — || align=right data-sort-value="0.96" | 960 m || 
|-id=525 bgcolor=#d6d6d6
| 483525 ||  || — || September 16, 2003 || Kitt Peak || Spacewatch || — || align=right | 3.1 km || 
|-id=526 bgcolor=#d6d6d6
| 483526 ||  || — || September 26, 2003 || Apache Point || SDSS || — || align=right | 2.5 km || 
|-id=527 bgcolor=#d6d6d6
| 483527 ||  || — || September 18, 2003 || Kitt Peak || Spacewatch || — || align=right | 2.4 km || 
|-id=528 bgcolor=#E9E9E9
| 483528 ||  || — || September 18, 2003 || Kitt Peak || Spacewatch || — || align=right data-sort-value="0.90" | 900 m || 
|-id=529 bgcolor=#E9E9E9
| 483529 ||  || — || October 1, 2003 || Kitt Peak || Spacewatch || (5) || align=right data-sort-value="0.67" | 670 m || 
|-id=530 bgcolor=#d6d6d6
| 483530 ||  || — || October 3, 2003 || Kitt Peak || Spacewatch || — || align=right | 2.4 km || 
|-id=531 bgcolor=#FFC2E0
| 483531 ||  || — || October 23, 2003 || Socorro || LINEAR || AMO || align=right data-sort-value="0.36" | 360 m || 
|-id=532 bgcolor=#E9E9E9
| 483532 ||  || — || October 22, 2003 || Kitt Peak || Spacewatch || — || align=right | 1.8 km || 
|-id=533 bgcolor=#FA8072
| 483533 ||  || — || October 23, 2003 || Socorro || LINEAR || — || align=right | 2.5 km || 
|-id=534 bgcolor=#E9E9E9
| 483534 ||  || — || October 16, 2003 || Palomar || NEAT || — || align=right | 1.5 km || 
|-id=535 bgcolor=#FA8072
| 483535 ||  || — || October 18, 2003 || Palomar || NEAT || — || align=right data-sort-value="0.68" | 680 m || 
|-id=536 bgcolor=#fefefe
| 483536 ||  || — || October 19, 2003 || Kitt Peak || Spacewatch || — || align=right data-sort-value="0.62" | 620 m || 
|-id=537 bgcolor=#E9E9E9
| 483537 ||  || — || October 20, 2003 || Socorro || LINEAR || — || align=right | 1.3 km || 
|-id=538 bgcolor=#d6d6d6
| 483538 ||  || — || September 18, 2003 || Kitt Peak || Spacewatch || — || align=right | 3.6 km || 
|-id=539 bgcolor=#E9E9E9
| 483539 ||  || — || October 25, 2003 || Socorro || LINEAR || — || align=right | 1.3 km || 
|-id=540 bgcolor=#E9E9E9
| 483540 ||  || — || October 29, 2003 || Socorro || LINEAR || — || align=right data-sort-value="0.70" | 700 m || 
|-id=541 bgcolor=#E9E9E9
| 483541 ||  || — || October 18, 2003 || Anderson Mesa || LONEOS || — || align=right | 1.7 km || 
|-id=542 bgcolor=#E9E9E9
| 483542 ||  || — || October 20, 2003 || Kitt Peak || Spacewatch || (5) || align=right data-sort-value="0.65" | 650 m || 
|-id=543 bgcolor=#E9E9E9
| 483543 ||  || — || November 15, 2003 || Palomar || NEAT || — || align=right | 1.1 km || 
|-id=544 bgcolor=#fefefe
| 483544 ||  || — || November 18, 2003 || Kitt Peak || Spacewatch || H || align=right data-sort-value="0.85" | 850 m || 
|-id=545 bgcolor=#E9E9E9
| 483545 ||  || — || November 18, 2003 || Kitt Peak || Spacewatch || — || align=right data-sort-value="0.81" | 810 m || 
|-id=546 bgcolor=#E9E9E9
| 483546 ||  || — || November 16, 2003 || Kitt Peak || Spacewatch || MAR || align=right data-sort-value="0.88" | 880 m || 
|-id=547 bgcolor=#FFC2E0
| 483547 ||  || — || November 20, 2003 || Socorro || LINEAR || AMO +1km || align=right | 1.1 km || 
|-id=548 bgcolor=#E9E9E9
| 483548 ||  || — || November 18, 2003 || Kitt Peak || Spacewatch || EUN || align=right | 1.1 km || 
|-id=549 bgcolor=#E9E9E9
| 483549 ||  || — || November 19, 2003 || Campo Imperatore || CINEOS || — || align=right data-sort-value="0.73" | 730 m || 
|-id=550 bgcolor=#E9E9E9
| 483550 ||  || — || November 19, 2003 || Kitt Peak || Spacewatch || (5) || align=right data-sort-value="0.55" | 550 m || 
|-id=551 bgcolor=#FA8072
| 483551 ||  || — || December 3, 2003 || Anderson Mesa || LONEOS || H || align=right data-sort-value="0.79" | 790 m || 
|-id=552 bgcolor=#fefefe
| 483552 ||  || — || December 3, 2003 || Socorro || LINEAR || H || align=right data-sort-value="0.81" | 810 m || 
|-id=553 bgcolor=#E9E9E9
| 483553 ||  || — || November 24, 2003 || Kitt Peak || Spacewatch || — || align=right data-sort-value="0.94" | 940 m || 
|-id=554 bgcolor=#fefefe
| 483554 ||  || — || November 19, 2003 || Socorro || LINEAR || H || align=right data-sort-value="0.71" | 710 m || 
|-id=555 bgcolor=#FA8072
| 483555 ||  || — || December 17, 2003 || Socorro || LINEAR || — || align=right | 1.8 km || 
|-id=556 bgcolor=#E9E9E9
| 483556 ||  || — || December 17, 2003 || Kitt Peak || Spacewatch || — || align=right | 1.4 km || 
|-id=557 bgcolor=#fefefe
| 483557 ||  || — || December 22, 2003 || Socorro || LINEAR || H || align=right data-sort-value="0.80" | 800 m || 
|-id=558 bgcolor=#FA8072
| 483558 ||  || — || December 22, 2003 || Kitt Peak || Spacewatch || — || align=right | 1.9 km || 
|-id=559 bgcolor=#E9E9E9
| 483559 ||  || — || December 28, 2003 || Kitt Peak || Spacewatch || — || align=right | 1.5 km || 
|-id=560 bgcolor=#FFC2E0
| 483560 ||  || — || January 16, 2004 || Kitt Peak || Spacewatch || APOPHA || align=right data-sort-value="0.51" | 510 m || 
|-id=561 bgcolor=#E9E9E9
| 483561 ||  || — || January 19, 2004 || Anderson Mesa || LONEOS || — || align=right | 1.4 km || 
|-id=562 bgcolor=#FA8072
| 483562 ||  || — || January 21, 2004 || Socorro || LINEAR || H || align=right data-sort-value="0.67" | 670 m || 
|-id=563 bgcolor=#FFC2E0
| 483563 ||  || — || January 26, 2004 || Anderson Mesa || LONEOS || APO || align=right data-sort-value="0.66" | 660 m || 
|-id=564 bgcolor=#fefefe
| 483564 ||  || — || December 29, 2003 || Kitt Peak || Spacewatch || — || align=right | 1.7 km || 
|-id=565 bgcolor=#E9E9E9
| 483565 ||  || — || December 29, 2003 || Kitt Peak || Spacewatch || — || align=right | 1.4 km || 
|-id=566 bgcolor=#FFC2E0
| 483566 ||  || — || January 28, 2004 || Socorro || LINEAR || AMO +1kmcritical || align=right data-sort-value="0.98" | 980 m || 
|-id=567 bgcolor=#E9E9E9
| 483567 ||  || — || February 10, 2004 || Palomar || NEAT || — || align=right | 3.2 km || 
|-id=568 bgcolor=#fefefe
| 483568 ||  || — || January 31, 2004 || Kitt Peak || Spacewatch || — || align=right data-sort-value="0.55" | 550 m || 
|-id=569 bgcolor=#fefefe
| 483569 ||  || — || February 12, 2004 || Kitt Peak || Spacewatch || H || align=right data-sort-value="0.79" | 790 m || 
|-id=570 bgcolor=#FA8072
| 483570 ||  || — || February 15, 2004 || Socorro || LINEAR || H || align=right data-sort-value="0.80" | 800 m || 
|-id=571 bgcolor=#fefefe
| 483571 ||  || — || February 18, 2004 || Socorro || LINEAR || H || align=right data-sort-value="0.71" | 710 m || 
|-id=572 bgcolor=#E9E9E9
| 483572 ||  || — || December 29, 2003 || Kitt Peak || Spacewatch || — || align=right | 1.1 km || 
|-id=573 bgcolor=#fefefe
| 483573 ||  || — || February 16, 2004 || Socorro || LINEAR || H || align=right data-sort-value="0.73" | 730 m || 
|-id=574 bgcolor=#fefefe
| 483574 ||  || — || March 15, 2004 || Kitt Peak || Spacewatch || H || align=right data-sort-value="0.88" | 880 m || 
|-id=575 bgcolor=#E9E9E9
| 483575 ||  || — || March 15, 2004 || Catalina || CSS || — || align=right | 1.2 km || 
|-id=576 bgcolor=#fefefe
| 483576 ||  || — || March 15, 2004 || Socorro || LINEAR || H || align=right data-sort-value="0.74" | 740 m || 
|-id=577 bgcolor=#fefefe
| 483577 ||  || — || March 15, 2004 || Kitt Peak || Spacewatch || H || align=right data-sort-value="0.67" | 670 m || 
|-id=578 bgcolor=#E9E9E9
| 483578 ||  || — || February 16, 2004 || Socorro || LINEAR || — || align=right | 1.4 km || 
|-id=579 bgcolor=#E9E9E9
| 483579 ||  || — || February 23, 2004 || Socorro || LINEAR || — || align=right | 2.5 km || 
|-id=580 bgcolor=#E9E9E9
| 483580 ||  || — || February 26, 2004 || Socorro || LINEAR || — || align=right | 1.3 km || 
|-id=581 bgcolor=#fefefe
| 483581 ||  || — || March 17, 2004 || Socorro || LINEAR || H || align=right data-sort-value="0.90" | 900 m || 
|-id=582 bgcolor=#fefefe
| 483582 ||  || — || March 22, 2004 || Socorro || LINEAR || H || align=right data-sort-value="0.67" | 670 m || 
|-id=583 bgcolor=#E9E9E9
| 483583 ||  || — || March 15, 2004 || Kitt Peak || Spacewatch || — || align=right | 2.0 km || 
|-id=584 bgcolor=#E9E9E9
| 483584 ||  || — || March 19, 2004 || Socorro || LINEAR || — || align=right | 2.4 km || 
|-id=585 bgcolor=#fefefe
| 483585 ||  || — || March 19, 2004 || Socorro || LINEAR || H || align=right data-sort-value="0.76" | 760 m || 
|-id=586 bgcolor=#E9E9E9
| 483586 ||  || — || February 24, 2004 || Bergisch Gladbach || W. Bickel || — || align=right | 1.4 km || 
|-id=587 bgcolor=#E9E9E9
| 483587 ||  || — || March 27, 2004 || Socorro || LINEAR || — || align=right | 1.6 km || 
|-id=588 bgcolor=#E9E9E9
| 483588 ||  || — || March 27, 2004 || Socorro || LINEAR || — || align=right | 1.9 km || 
|-id=589 bgcolor=#E9E9E9
| 483589 ||  || — || April 15, 2004 || Socorro || LINEAR || — || align=right | 1.8 km || 
|-id=590 bgcolor=#fefefe
| 483590 ||  || — || May 12, 2004 || Reedy Creek || J. Broughton || — || align=right data-sort-value="0.85" | 850 m || 
|-id=591 bgcolor=#FA8072
| 483591 ||  || — || May 15, 2004 || Socorro || LINEAR || — || align=right data-sort-value="0.37" | 370 m || 
|-id=592 bgcolor=#fefefe
| 483592 ||  || — || June 22, 2004 || Wrightwood || J. W. Young || — || align=right data-sort-value="0.89" | 890 m || 
|-id=593 bgcolor=#E9E9E9
| 483593 ||  || — || June 23, 2004 || Siding Spring || SSS || — || align=right | 2.3 km || 
|-id=594 bgcolor=#fefefe
| 483594 ||  || — || August 6, 2004 || Palomar || NEAT || — || align=right data-sort-value="0.91" | 910 m || 
|-id=595 bgcolor=#fefefe
| 483595 ||  || — || August 7, 2004 || Palomar || NEAT || — || align=right data-sort-value="0.98" | 980 m || 
|-id=596 bgcolor=#fefefe
| 483596 ||  || — || August 8, 2004 || Socorro || LINEAR || — || align=right data-sort-value="0.84" | 840 m || 
|-id=597 bgcolor=#fefefe
| 483597 ||  || — || August 8, 2004 || Socorro || LINEAR || — || align=right data-sort-value="0.94" | 940 m || 
|-id=598 bgcolor=#fefefe
| 483598 ||  || — || August 11, 2004 || Campo Imperatore || CINEOS || — || align=right data-sort-value="0.94" | 940 m || 
|-id=599 bgcolor=#d6d6d6
| 483599 ||  || — || August 15, 2004 || Campo Imperatore || CINEOS || — || align=right | 3.2 km || 
|-id=600 bgcolor=#d6d6d6
| 483600 ||  || — || August 10, 2004 || Socorro || LINEAR || — || align=right | 2.8 km || 
|}

483601–483700 

|-bgcolor=#fefefe
| 483601 ||  || — || September 7, 2004 || Kitt Peak || Spacewatch || NYS || align=right data-sort-value="0.63" | 630 m || 
|-id=602 bgcolor=#fefefe
| 483602 ||  || — || September 7, 2004 || Socorro || LINEAR || NYS || align=right data-sort-value="0.79" | 790 m || 
|-id=603 bgcolor=#FA8072
| 483603 ||  || — || July 22, 2004 || Siding Spring || SSS || — || align=right | 1.2 km || 
|-id=604 bgcolor=#fefefe
| 483604 ||  || — || September 8, 2004 || Socorro || LINEAR || — || align=right data-sort-value="0.76" | 760 m || 
|-id=605 bgcolor=#d6d6d6
| 483605 ||  || — || September 6, 2004 || Goodricke-Pigott || Goodricke-Pigott Obs. || — || align=right | 2.6 km || 
|-id=606 bgcolor=#fefefe
| 483606 ||  || — || September 7, 2004 || Goodricke-Pigott || Goodricke-Pigott Obs. || — || align=right data-sort-value="0.93" | 930 m || 
|-id=607 bgcolor=#d6d6d6
| 483607 ||  || — || September 9, 2004 || Socorro || LINEAR || — || align=right | 2.6 km || 
|-id=608 bgcolor=#d6d6d6
| 483608 ||  || — || September 10, 2004 || Socorro || LINEAR || — || align=right | 2.5 km || 
|-id=609 bgcolor=#fefefe
| 483609 ||  || — || July 15, 2004 || Socorro || LINEAR || — || align=right | 1.6 km || 
|-id=610 bgcolor=#d6d6d6
| 483610 ||  || — || September 12, 2004 || Socorro || LINEAR || — || align=right | 3.6 km || 
|-id=611 bgcolor=#fefefe
| 483611 ||  || — || September 7, 2004 || Socorro || LINEAR || — || align=right data-sort-value="0.82" | 820 m || 
|-id=612 bgcolor=#d6d6d6
| 483612 ||  || — || September 11, 2004 || Kitt Peak || Spacewatch || EOS || align=right | 1.3 km || 
|-id=613 bgcolor=#d6d6d6
| 483613 ||  || — || September 12, 2004 || Kitt Peak || Spacewatch || — || align=right | 2.3 km || 
|-id=614 bgcolor=#d6d6d6
| 483614 ||  || — || August 26, 2004 || Catalina || CSS || — || align=right | 3.4 km || 
|-id=615 bgcolor=#d6d6d6
| 483615 ||  || — || September 18, 2004 || Moletai || Molėtai Obs. || EOS || align=right | 2.0 km || 
|-id=616 bgcolor=#E9E9E9
| 483616 ||  || — || October 10, 2004 || Kitt Peak || Spacewatch || — || align=right | 1.0 km || 
|-id=617 bgcolor=#d6d6d6
| 483617 ||  || — || October 5, 2004 || Kitt Peak || Spacewatch || — || align=right | 2.0 km || 
|-id=618 bgcolor=#d6d6d6
| 483618 ||  || — || September 23, 2004 || Kitt Peak || Spacewatch || THM || align=right | 1.6 km || 
|-id=619 bgcolor=#d6d6d6
| 483619 ||  || — || October 5, 2004 || Kitt Peak || Spacewatch || — || align=right | 2.0 km || 
|-id=620 bgcolor=#d6d6d6
| 483620 ||  || — || October 7, 2004 || Socorro || LINEAR || — || align=right | 3.3 km || 
|-id=621 bgcolor=#d6d6d6
| 483621 ||  || — || September 18, 2004 || Socorro || LINEAR || — || align=right | 2.5 km || 
|-id=622 bgcolor=#d6d6d6
| 483622 ||  || — || October 4, 2004 || Kitt Peak || Spacewatch || — || align=right | 2.6 km || 
|-id=623 bgcolor=#fefefe
| 483623 ||  || — || October 7, 2004 || Kitt Peak || Spacewatch || — || align=right data-sort-value="0.77" | 770 m || 
|-id=624 bgcolor=#fefefe
| 483624 ||  || — || October 7, 2004 || Kitt Peak || Spacewatch || MAS || align=right data-sort-value="0.68" | 680 m || 
|-id=625 bgcolor=#fefefe
| 483625 ||  || — || October 7, 2004 || Kitt Peak || Spacewatch || NYS || align=right data-sort-value="0.62" | 620 m || 
|-id=626 bgcolor=#fefefe
| 483626 ||  || — || October 7, 2004 || Kitt Peak || Spacewatch || NYS || align=right data-sort-value="0.78" | 780 m || 
|-id=627 bgcolor=#d6d6d6
| 483627 ||  || — || October 8, 2004 || Kitt Peak || Spacewatch || EOS || align=right | 1.8 km || 
|-id=628 bgcolor=#d6d6d6
| 483628 ||  || — || September 7, 2004 || Kitt Peak || Spacewatch || — || align=right | 2.4 km || 
|-id=629 bgcolor=#d6d6d6
| 483629 ||  || — || September 13, 2004 || Socorro || LINEAR || — || align=right | 3.2 km || 
|-id=630 bgcolor=#d6d6d6
| 483630 ||  || — || October 7, 2004 || Kitt Peak || Spacewatch || — || align=right | 2.7 km || 
|-id=631 bgcolor=#fefefe
| 483631 ||  || — || October 9, 2004 || Kitt Peak || Spacewatch || MAS || align=right data-sort-value="0.65" | 650 m || 
|-id=632 bgcolor=#d6d6d6
| 483632 ||  || — || October 9, 2004 || Kitt Peak || Spacewatch || — || align=right | 2.8 km || 
|-id=633 bgcolor=#d6d6d6
| 483633 ||  || — || September 23, 2004 || Kitt Peak || Spacewatch || — || align=right | 2.3 km || 
|-id=634 bgcolor=#d6d6d6
| 483634 ||  || — || October 8, 2004 || Socorro || LINEAR || — || align=right | 2.7 km || 
|-id=635 bgcolor=#d6d6d6
| 483635 ||  || — || October 4, 2004 || Palomar || NEAT || — || align=right | 3.4 km || 
|-id=636 bgcolor=#fefefe
| 483636 ||  || — || October 11, 2004 || Moletai || Molėtai Obs. || — || align=right data-sort-value="0.78" | 780 m || 
|-id=637 bgcolor=#d6d6d6
| 483637 ||  || — || October 12, 2004 || Moletai || Molėtai Obs. || — || align=right | 3.6 km || 
|-id=638 bgcolor=#d6d6d6
| 483638 ||  || — || October 18, 2004 || Kitt Peak || M. W. Buie || THM || align=right | 2.1 km || 
|-id=639 bgcolor=#d6d6d6
| 483639 ||  || — || October 7, 2004 || Kitt Peak || Spacewatch || — || align=right | 2.7 km || 
|-id=640 bgcolor=#d6d6d6
| 483640 ||  || — || November 4, 2004 || Kitt Peak || Spacewatch || (159) || align=right | 2.6 km || 
|-id=641 bgcolor=#d6d6d6
| 483641 ||  || — || November 4, 2004 || Kitt Peak || Spacewatch || — || align=right | 2.5 km || 
|-id=642 bgcolor=#d6d6d6
| 483642 ||  || — || November 12, 2004 || Catalina || CSS || — || align=right | 4.9 km || 
|-id=643 bgcolor=#d6d6d6
| 483643 ||  || — || November 11, 2004 || Kitt Peak || Spacewatch || — || align=right | 2.9 km || 
|-id=644 bgcolor=#fefefe
| 483644 ||  || — || December 10, 2004 || Socorro || LINEAR || — || align=right data-sort-value="0.86" | 860 m || 
|-id=645 bgcolor=#d6d6d6
| 483645 ||  || — || November 11, 2004 || Kitt Peak || Spacewatch || — || align=right | 2.4 km || 
|-id=646 bgcolor=#d6d6d6
| 483646 ||  || — || December 7, 2004 || Socorro || LINEAR || — || align=right | 3.7 km || 
|-id=647 bgcolor=#E9E9E9
| 483647 ||  || — || December 11, 2004 || Catalina || CSS || — || align=right | 1.9 km || 
|-id=648 bgcolor=#d6d6d6
| 483648 ||  || — || December 16, 2004 || Kitt Peak || Spacewatch || — || align=right | 3.8 km || 
|-id=649 bgcolor=#C2FFFF
| 483649 ||  || — || December 18, 2004 || Mount Lemmon || Mount Lemmon Survey || L5 || align=right | 10 km || 
|-id=650 bgcolor=#d6d6d6
| 483650 ||  || — || January 7, 2005 || Pla D'Arguines || R. Ferrando || — || align=right | 3.2 km || 
|-id=651 bgcolor=#E9E9E9
| 483651 ||  || — || January 7, 2005 || Catalina || CSS || — || align=right | 1.6 km || 
|-id=652 bgcolor=#C2FFFF
| 483652 ||  || — || February 8, 2005 || La Silla || C. Vuissoz, R. Behrend || L5critical || align=right | 11 km || 
|-id=653 bgcolor=#d6d6d6
| 483653 ||  || — || February 4, 2005 || Calvin-Rehoboth || Calvin–Rehoboth Obs. || — || align=right | 3.6 km || 
|-id=654 bgcolor=#E9E9E9
| 483654 ||  || — || March 4, 2005 || Catalina || CSS || — || align=right | 1.1 km || 
|-id=655 bgcolor=#E9E9E9
| 483655 ||  || — || February 14, 2005 || Kitt Peak || Spacewatch || — || align=right | 1.3 km || 
|-id=656 bgcolor=#FFC2E0
| 483656 ||  || — || March 9, 2005 || Catalina || CSS || ATEfast || align=right data-sort-value="0.063" | 63 m || 
|-id=657 bgcolor=#E9E9E9
| 483657 ||  || — || March 3, 2005 || Goodricke-Pigott || Goodricke-Pigott Obs. || — || align=right | 2.0 km || 
|-id=658 bgcolor=#E9E9E9
| 483658 ||  || — || March 4, 2005 || Mount Lemmon || Mount Lemmon Survey || — || align=right data-sort-value="0.75" | 750 m || 
|-id=659 bgcolor=#E9E9E9
| 483659 ||  || — || March 9, 2005 || Socorro || LINEAR || — || align=right data-sort-value="0.95" | 950 m || 
|-id=660 bgcolor=#fefefe
| 483660 ||  || — || March 11, 2005 || Kitt Peak || Spacewatch || — || align=right data-sort-value="0.69" | 690 m || 
|-id=661 bgcolor=#E9E9E9
| 483661 ||  || — || March 4, 2005 || Mount Lemmon || Mount Lemmon Survey || — || align=right data-sort-value="0.76" | 760 m || 
|-id=662 bgcolor=#FFC2E0
| 483662 ||  || — || March 13, 2005 || Socorro || LINEAR || AMO || align=right data-sort-value="0.43" | 430 m || 
|-id=663 bgcolor=#E9E9E9
| 483663 ||  || — || March 12, 2005 || Kitt Peak || Spacewatch || — || align=right | 1.6 km || 
|-id=664 bgcolor=#C2FFFF
| 483664 ||  || — || February 2, 2005 || Kitt Peak || Spacewatch || L5 || align=right | 11 km || 
|-id=665 bgcolor=#E9E9E9
| 483665 ||  || — || April 2, 2005 || Hormersdorf || J. Lorenz || — || align=right | 1.7 km || 
|-id=666 bgcolor=#E9E9E9
| 483666 ||  || — || April 4, 2005 || Catalina || CSS || — || align=right data-sort-value="0.90" | 900 m || 
|-id=667 bgcolor=#d6d6d6
| 483667 ||  || — || April 4, 2005 || Kitt Peak || Spacewatch || 7:4 || align=right | 2.6 km || 
|-id=668 bgcolor=#d6d6d6
| 483668 ||  || — || April 7, 2005 || Campo Catino || CAOS || criticalTj (2.95) || align=right | 2.8 km || 
|-id=669 bgcolor=#E9E9E9
| 483669 ||  || — || April 11, 2005 || Kitt Peak || Spacewatch || — || align=right | 1.2 km || 
|-id=670 bgcolor=#E9E9E9
| 483670 ||  || — || May 4, 2005 || Mauna Kea || C. Veillet || MAR || align=right data-sort-value="0.76" | 760 m || 
|-id=671 bgcolor=#E9E9E9
| 483671 ||  || — || May 4, 2005 || Kitt Peak || Spacewatch || — || align=right | 1.7 km || 
|-id=672 bgcolor=#E9E9E9
| 483672 ||  || — || May 9, 2005 || Kitt Peak || Spacewatch || — || align=right data-sort-value="0.86" | 860 m || 
|-id=673 bgcolor=#E9E9E9
| 483673 ||  || — || May 9, 2005 || Anderson Mesa || LONEOS || — || align=right | 1.8 km || 
|-id=674 bgcolor=#E9E9E9
| 483674 ||  || — || May 11, 2005 || Kitt Peak || Spacewatch || — || align=right data-sort-value="0.85" | 850 m || 
|-id=675 bgcolor=#E9E9E9
| 483675 ||  || — || May 11, 2005 || Kitt Peak || Spacewatch || RAF || align=right data-sort-value="0.81" | 810 m || 
|-id=676 bgcolor=#E9E9E9
| 483676 ||  || — || June 16, 2005 || Kitt Peak || Spacewatch || — || align=right | 1.5 km || 
|-id=677 bgcolor=#E9E9E9
| 483677 ||  || — || June 13, 2005 || Mount Lemmon || Mount Lemmon Survey || — || align=right | 1.3 km || 
|-id=678 bgcolor=#E9E9E9
| 483678 ||  || — || June 18, 2005 || Mount Lemmon || Mount Lemmon Survey || — || align=right | 2.4 km || 
|-id=679 bgcolor=#fefefe
| 483679 ||  || — || July 1, 2005 || Anderson Mesa || LONEOS || — || align=right | 1.1 km || 
|-id=680 bgcolor=#FA8072
| 483680 ||  || — || July 2, 2005 || Kitt Peak || Spacewatch || — || align=right | 1.2 km || 
|-id=681 bgcolor=#fefefe
| 483681 ||  || — || June 13, 2005 || Mount Lemmon || Mount Lemmon Survey || — || align=right data-sort-value="0.54" | 540 m || 
|-id=682 bgcolor=#fefefe
| 483682 ||  || — || July 6, 2005 || Kitt Peak || Spacewatch || H || align=right data-sort-value="0.73" | 730 m || 
|-id=683 bgcolor=#E9E9E9
| 483683 ||  || — || June 18, 2005 || Mount Lemmon || Mount Lemmon Survey || — || align=right | 1.5 km || 
|-id=684 bgcolor=#fefefe
| 483684 ||  || — || July 1, 2005 || Palomar || NEAT || H || align=right data-sort-value="0.61" | 610 m || 
|-id=685 bgcolor=#fefefe
| 483685 ||  || — || June 18, 2005 || Mount Lemmon || Mount Lemmon Survey || — || align=right data-sort-value="0.81" | 810 m || 
|-id=686 bgcolor=#E9E9E9
| 483686 ||  || — || July 11, 2005 || Anderson Mesa || LONEOS || — || align=right | 1.8 km || 
|-id=687 bgcolor=#E9E9E9
| 483687 ||  || — || July 1, 2005 || Kitt Peak || Spacewatch || — || align=right | 2.3 km || 
|-id=688 bgcolor=#E9E9E9
| 483688 ||  || — || July 28, 2005 || Palomar || NEAT ||  || align=right | 2.9 km || 
|-id=689 bgcolor=#E9E9E9
| 483689 ||  || — || July 30, 2005 || Palomar || NEAT || — || align=right | 2.4 km || 
|-id=690 bgcolor=#fefefe
| 483690 ||  || — || August 29, 2005 || Begues || Begues Obs. || — || align=right data-sort-value="0.68" | 680 m || 
|-id=691 bgcolor=#d6d6d6
| 483691 ||  || — || August 28, 2005 || Kitt Peak || Spacewatch || KOR || align=right | 1.3 km || 
|-id=692 bgcolor=#E9E9E9
| 483692 ||  || — || August 28, 2005 || Kitt Peak || Spacewatch || (1547) || align=right | 1.8 km || 
|-id=693 bgcolor=#E9E9E9
| 483693 ||  || — || August 30, 2005 || Kitt Peak || Spacewatch || — || align=right | 2.3 km || 
|-id=694 bgcolor=#E9E9E9
| 483694 ||  || — || August 30, 2005 || Socorro || LINEAR || — || align=right | 1.8 km || 
|-id=695 bgcolor=#E9E9E9
| 483695 ||  || — || August 28, 2005 || Anderson Mesa || LONEOS || — || align=right | 2.4 km || 
|-id=696 bgcolor=#E9E9E9
| 483696 ||  || — || September 8, 2005 || Socorro || LINEAR || — || align=right | 2.3 km || 
|-id=697 bgcolor=#fefefe
| 483697 ||  || — || September 13, 2005 || Catalina || CSS || H || align=right data-sort-value="0.80" | 800 m || 
|-id=698 bgcolor=#E9E9E9
| 483698 ||  || — || September 14, 2005 || Apache Point || A. C. Becker || — || align=right | 1.8 km || 
|-id=699 bgcolor=#fefefe
| 483699 ||  || — || September 24, 2005 || Kitt Peak || Spacewatch || — || align=right data-sort-value="0.62" | 620 m || 
|-id=700 bgcolor=#fefefe
| 483700 ||  || — || September 26, 2005 || Kitt Peak || Spacewatch || — || align=right data-sort-value="0.59" | 590 m || 
|}

483701–483800 

|-bgcolor=#fefefe
| 483701 ||  || — || September 26, 2005 || Kitt Peak || Spacewatch || — || align=right data-sort-value="0.75" | 750 m || 
|-id=702 bgcolor=#fefefe
| 483702 ||  || — || August 29, 2005 || Anderson Mesa || LONEOS || — || align=right data-sort-value="0.84" | 840 m || 
|-id=703 bgcolor=#fefefe
| 483703 ||  || — || September 14, 2005 || Kitt Peak || Spacewatch || — || align=right data-sort-value="0.68" | 680 m || 
|-id=704 bgcolor=#d6d6d6
| 483704 ||  || — || September 25, 2005 || Kitt Peak || Spacewatch || — || align=right | 3.0 km || 
|-id=705 bgcolor=#fefefe
| 483705 ||  || — || September 27, 2005 || Kitt Peak || Spacewatch || critical || align=right data-sort-value="0.59" | 590 m || 
|-id=706 bgcolor=#d6d6d6
| 483706 ||  || — || September 27, 2005 || Kitt Peak || Spacewatch || — || align=right | 1.9 km || 
|-id=707 bgcolor=#fefefe
| 483707 ||  || — || September 29, 2005 || Kitt Peak || Spacewatch || (2076) || align=right data-sort-value="0.68" | 680 m || 
|-id=708 bgcolor=#d6d6d6
| 483708 ||  || — || September 25, 2005 || Kitt Peak || Spacewatch || — || align=right | 1.9 km || 
|-id=709 bgcolor=#d6d6d6
| 483709 ||  || — || September 26, 2005 || Kitt Peak || Spacewatch || — || align=right | 2.1 km || 
|-id=710 bgcolor=#fefefe
| 483710 ||  || — || September 29, 2005 || Mount Lemmon || Mount Lemmon Survey || — || align=right data-sort-value="0.68" | 680 m || 
|-id=711 bgcolor=#E9E9E9
| 483711 ||  || — || September 14, 2005 || Catalina || CSS || — || align=right | 2.6 km || 
|-id=712 bgcolor=#fefefe
| 483712 ||  || — || September 29, 2005 || Kitt Peak || Spacewatch || — || align=right data-sort-value="0.74" | 740 m || 
|-id=713 bgcolor=#fefefe
| 483713 ||  || — || September 23, 2005 || Catalina || CSS || — || align=right data-sort-value="0.83" | 830 m || 
|-id=714 bgcolor=#fefefe
| 483714 ||  || — || October 1, 2005 || Mount Lemmon || Mount Lemmon Survey || — || align=right data-sort-value="0.57" | 570 m || 
|-id=715 bgcolor=#fefefe
| 483715 ||  || — || September 3, 2005 || Catalina || CSS || — || align=right data-sort-value="0.90" | 900 m || 
|-id=716 bgcolor=#fefefe
| 483716 ||  || — || October 1, 2005 || Mount Lemmon || Mount Lemmon Survey || H || align=right data-sort-value="0.68" | 680 m || 
|-id=717 bgcolor=#fefefe
| 483717 ||  || — || October 1, 2005 || Mount Lemmon || Mount Lemmon Survey || — || align=right data-sort-value="0.52" | 520 m || 
|-id=718 bgcolor=#fefefe
| 483718 ||  || — || October 1, 2005 || Mount Lemmon || Mount Lemmon Survey || — || align=right data-sort-value="0.78" | 780 m || 
|-id=719 bgcolor=#fefefe
| 483719 ||  || — || October 4, 2005 || Mount Lemmon || Mount Lemmon Survey || — || align=right data-sort-value="0.65" | 650 m || 
|-id=720 bgcolor=#FA8072
| 483720 ||  || — || October 3, 2005 || Catalina || CSS || — || align=right data-sort-value="0.62" | 620 m || 
|-id=721 bgcolor=#fefefe
| 483721 ||  || — || October 3, 2005 || Kitt Peak || Spacewatch || — || align=right data-sort-value="0.71" | 710 m || 
|-id=722 bgcolor=#d6d6d6
| 483722 ||  || — || October 5, 2005 || Kitt Peak || Spacewatch || KOR || align=right | 1.0 km || 
|-id=723 bgcolor=#fefefe
| 483723 ||  || — || August 30, 2005 || Kitt Peak || Spacewatch || — || align=right data-sort-value="0.75" | 750 m || 
|-id=724 bgcolor=#fefefe
| 483724 ||  || — || September 24, 2005 || Kitt Peak || Spacewatch || — || align=right data-sort-value="0.75" | 750 m || 
|-id=725 bgcolor=#d6d6d6
| 483725 ||  || — || October 6, 2005 || Mount Lemmon || Mount Lemmon Survey || — || align=right | 2.0 km || 
|-id=726 bgcolor=#fefefe
| 483726 ||  || — || October 8, 2005 || Anderson Mesa || LONEOS || — || align=right data-sort-value="0.97" | 970 m || 
|-id=727 bgcolor=#fefefe
| 483727 ||  || — || September 27, 2005 || Kitt Peak || Spacewatch || — || align=right data-sort-value="0.66" | 660 m || 
|-id=728 bgcolor=#fefefe
| 483728 ||  || — || October 1, 2005 || Kitt Peak || Spacewatch || — || align=right data-sort-value="0.59" | 590 m || 
|-id=729 bgcolor=#fefefe
| 483729 ||  || — || September 25, 2005 || Kitt Peak || Spacewatch || — || align=right data-sort-value="0.57" | 570 m || 
|-id=730 bgcolor=#d6d6d6
| 483730 ||  || — || October 8, 2005 || Kitt Peak || Spacewatch || — || align=right | 2.0 km || 
|-id=731 bgcolor=#fefefe
| 483731 ||  || — || October 6, 2005 || Mount Lemmon || Mount Lemmon Survey || — || align=right data-sort-value="0.52" | 520 m || 
|-id=732 bgcolor=#fefefe
| 483732 ||  || — || October 9, 2005 || Kitt Peak || Spacewatch || — || align=right data-sort-value="0.54" | 540 m || 
|-id=733 bgcolor=#d6d6d6
| 483733 ||  || — || October 11, 2005 || Kitt Peak || Spacewatch || — || align=right | 1.8 km || 
|-id=734 bgcolor=#fefefe
| 483734 ||  || — || October 8, 2005 || Socorro || LINEAR || — || align=right data-sort-value="0.90" | 900 m || 
|-id=735 bgcolor=#fefefe
| 483735 ||  || — || October 1, 2005 || Kitt Peak || Spacewatch || H || align=right data-sort-value="0.57" | 570 m || 
|-id=736 bgcolor=#fefefe
| 483736 ||  || — || October 2, 2005 || Mount Lemmon || Mount Lemmon Survey || — || align=right data-sort-value="0.72" | 720 m || 
|-id=737 bgcolor=#fefefe
| 483737 ||  || — || October 6, 2005 || Catalina || CSS || H || align=right data-sort-value="0.59" | 590 m || 
|-id=738 bgcolor=#fefefe
| 483738 ||  || — || October 7, 2005 || Catalina || CSS || — || align=right data-sort-value="0.77" | 770 m || 
|-id=739 bgcolor=#fefefe
| 483739 ||  || — || October 21, 2005 || Palomar || NEAT || — || align=right data-sort-value="0.83" | 830 m || 
|-id=740 bgcolor=#fefefe
| 483740 ||  || — || October 22, 2005 || Kitt Peak || Spacewatch || — || align=right data-sort-value="0.73" | 730 m || 
|-id=741 bgcolor=#fefefe
| 483741 ||  || — || October 23, 2005 || Kitt Peak || Spacewatch || — || align=right data-sort-value="0.60" | 600 m || 
|-id=742 bgcolor=#fefefe
| 483742 ||  || — || September 30, 2005 || Mount Lemmon || Mount Lemmon Survey || — || align=right data-sort-value="0.68" | 680 m || 
|-id=743 bgcolor=#fefefe
| 483743 ||  || — || October 24, 2005 || Kitt Peak || Spacewatch || — || align=right data-sort-value="0.65" | 650 m || 
|-id=744 bgcolor=#fefefe
| 483744 ||  || — || October 27, 2005 || Needville || Needville Obs. || — || align=right data-sort-value="0.86" | 860 m || 
|-id=745 bgcolor=#fefefe
| 483745 ||  || — || September 25, 2005 || Kitt Peak || Spacewatch || H || align=right data-sort-value="0.79" | 790 m || 
|-id=746 bgcolor=#fefefe
| 483746 ||  || — || September 26, 2005 || Kitt Peak || Spacewatch || — || align=right data-sort-value="0.86" | 860 m || 
|-id=747 bgcolor=#d6d6d6
| 483747 ||  || — || September 29, 2005 || Catalina || CSS || 7:4* || align=right | 4.2 km || 
|-id=748 bgcolor=#fefefe
| 483748 ||  || — || October 22, 2005 || Kitt Peak || Spacewatch || — || align=right data-sort-value="0.62" | 620 m || 
|-id=749 bgcolor=#fefefe
| 483749 ||  || — || October 22, 2005 || Kitt Peak || Spacewatch || — || align=right data-sort-value="0.78" | 780 m || 
|-id=750 bgcolor=#fefefe
| 483750 ||  || — || October 1, 2005 || Mount Lemmon || Mount Lemmon Survey || — || align=right data-sort-value="0.62" | 620 m || 
|-id=751 bgcolor=#fefefe
| 483751 ||  || — || October 24, 2005 || Kitt Peak || Spacewatch || — || align=right data-sort-value="0.65" | 650 m || 
|-id=752 bgcolor=#fefefe
| 483752 ||  || — || October 2, 2005 || Anderson Mesa || LONEOS || — || align=right | 1.0 km || 
|-id=753 bgcolor=#fefefe
| 483753 ||  || — || October 24, 2005 || Kitt Peak || Spacewatch || NYS || align=right data-sort-value="0.58" | 580 m || 
|-id=754 bgcolor=#d6d6d6
| 483754 ||  || — || October 25, 2005 || Kitt Peak || Spacewatch || — || align=right | 2.5 km || 
|-id=755 bgcolor=#fefefe
| 483755 ||  || — || October 1, 2005 || Mount Lemmon || Mount Lemmon Survey || — || align=right data-sort-value="0.60" | 600 m || 
|-id=756 bgcolor=#fefefe
| 483756 ||  || — || October 26, 2005 || Kitt Peak || Spacewatch || NYS || align=right data-sort-value="0.69" | 690 m || 
|-id=757 bgcolor=#fefefe
| 483757 ||  || — || October 26, 2005 || Kitt Peak || Spacewatch || — || align=right data-sort-value="0.62" | 620 m || 
|-id=758 bgcolor=#fefefe
| 483758 ||  || — || October 24, 2005 || Kitt Peak || Spacewatch || — || align=right data-sort-value="0.62" | 620 m || 
|-id=759 bgcolor=#fefefe
| 483759 ||  || — || October 24, 2005 || Kitt Peak || Spacewatch || — || align=right data-sort-value="0.67" | 670 m || 
|-id=760 bgcolor=#fefefe
| 483760 ||  || — || October 24, 2005 || Kitt Peak || Spacewatch || — || align=right data-sort-value="0.71" | 710 m || 
|-id=761 bgcolor=#d6d6d6
| 483761 ||  || — || October 24, 2005 || Kitt Peak || Spacewatch || — || align=right | 1.9 km || 
|-id=762 bgcolor=#fefefe
| 483762 ||  || — || October 24, 2005 || Kitt Peak || Spacewatch || NYS || align=right data-sort-value="0.69" | 690 m || 
|-id=763 bgcolor=#d6d6d6
| 483763 ||  || — || October 25, 2005 || Mount Lemmon || Mount Lemmon Survey || — || align=right | 1.9 km || 
|-id=764 bgcolor=#d6d6d6
| 483764 ||  || — || October 27, 2005 || Mount Lemmon || Mount Lemmon Survey || — || align=right | 3.3 km || 
|-id=765 bgcolor=#fefefe
| 483765 ||  || — || October 1, 2005 || Kitt Peak || Spacewatch || — || align=right data-sort-value="0.54" | 540 m || 
|-id=766 bgcolor=#fefefe
| 483766 ||  || — || October 25, 2005 || Kitt Peak || Spacewatch || — || align=right data-sort-value="0.57" | 570 m || 
|-id=767 bgcolor=#fefefe
| 483767 ||  || — || October 25, 2005 || Kitt Peak || Spacewatch || — || align=right data-sort-value="0.57" | 570 m || 
|-id=768 bgcolor=#fefefe
| 483768 ||  || — || October 25, 2005 || Kitt Peak || Spacewatch || — || align=right data-sort-value="0.75" | 750 m || 
|-id=769 bgcolor=#d6d6d6
| 483769 ||  || — || October 25, 2005 || Kitt Peak || Spacewatch || KOR || align=right | 1.4 km || 
|-id=770 bgcolor=#E9E9E9
| 483770 ||  || — || October 25, 2005 || Kitt Peak || Spacewatch || — || align=right | 2.6 km || 
|-id=771 bgcolor=#fefefe
| 483771 ||  || — || September 29, 2005 || Kitt Peak || Spacewatch || — || align=right data-sort-value="0.68" | 680 m || 
|-id=772 bgcolor=#fefefe
| 483772 ||  || — || September 30, 2005 || Mount Lemmon || Mount Lemmon Survey || — || align=right data-sort-value="0.68" | 680 m || 
|-id=773 bgcolor=#fefefe
| 483773 ||  || — || October 26, 2005 || Kitt Peak || Spacewatch || — || align=right data-sort-value="0.59" | 590 m || 
|-id=774 bgcolor=#d6d6d6
| 483774 ||  || — || October 26, 2005 || Kitt Peak || Spacewatch || — || align=right | 1.7 km || 
|-id=775 bgcolor=#fefefe
| 483775 ||  || — || October 26, 2005 || Kitt Peak || Spacewatch || — || align=right data-sort-value="0.78" | 780 m || 
|-id=776 bgcolor=#fefefe
| 483776 ||  || — || October 27, 2005 || Mount Lemmon || Mount Lemmon Survey || — || align=right data-sort-value="0.62" | 620 m || 
|-id=777 bgcolor=#fefefe
| 483777 ||  || — || October 25, 2005 || Kitt Peak || Spacewatch || H || align=right data-sort-value="0.40" | 400 m || 
|-id=778 bgcolor=#fefefe
| 483778 ||  || — || October 30, 2005 || Kitt Peak || Spacewatch || — || align=right | 1.5 km || 
|-id=779 bgcolor=#fefefe
| 483779 ||  || — || October 30, 2005 || Kitt Peak || Spacewatch || — || align=right data-sort-value="0.52" | 520 m || 
|-id=780 bgcolor=#d6d6d6
| 483780 ||  || — || October 22, 2005 || Kitt Peak || Spacewatch || critical || align=right | 1.5 km || 
|-id=781 bgcolor=#d6d6d6
| 483781 ||  || — || October 1, 2005 || Mount Lemmon || Mount Lemmon Survey || — || align=right | 1.8 km || 
|-id=782 bgcolor=#d6d6d6
| 483782 ||  || — || October 23, 2005 || Catalina || CSS || — || align=right | 2.0 km || 
|-id=783 bgcolor=#d6d6d6
| 483783 ||  || — || October 25, 2005 || Kitt Peak || Spacewatch || — || align=right | 1.6 km || 
|-id=784 bgcolor=#fefefe
| 483784 ||  || — || October 28, 2005 || Kitt Peak || Spacewatch || critical || align=right data-sort-value="0.54" | 540 m || 
|-id=785 bgcolor=#fefefe
| 483785 ||  || — || October 28, 2005 || Kitt Peak || Spacewatch || NYS || align=right data-sort-value="0.44" | 440 m || 
|-id=786 bgcolor=#fefefe
| 483786 ||  || — || October 23, 2005 || Catalina || CSS || — || align=right data-sort-value="0.86" | 860 m || 
|-id=787 bgcolor=#fefefe
| 483787 ||  || — || October 30, 2005 || Kitt Peak || Spacewatch || — || align=right data-sort-value="0.65" | 650 m || 
|-id=788 bgcolor=#d6d6d6
| 483788 ||  || — || October 29, 2005 || Kitt Peak || Spacewatch || — || align=right | 1.9 km || 
|-id=789 bgcolor=#d6d6d6
| 483789 ||  || — || October 1, 2005 || Mount Lemmon || Mount Lemmon Survey || 3:2 || align=right | 3.8 km || 
|-id=790 bgcolor=#fefefe
| 483790 ||  || — || November 4, 2005 || Kitt Peak || Spacewatch || — || align=right data-sort-value="0.76" | 760 m || 
|-id=791 bgcolor=#fefefe
| 483791 ||  || — || November 4, 2005 || Kitt Peak || Spacewatch || — || align=right data-sort-value="0.95" | 950 m || 
|-id=792 bgcolor=#d6d6d6
| 483792 ||  || — || October 25, 2005 || Kitt Peak || Spacewatch || KOR || align=right | 1.2 km || 
|-id=793 bgcolor=#fefefe
| 483793 ||  || — || November 1, 2005 || Mount Lemmon || Mount Lemmon Survey || — || align=right data-sort-value="0.59" | 590 m || 
|-id=794 bgcolor=#d6d6d6
| 483794 ||  || — || November 5, 2005 || Kitt Peak || Spacewatch || — || align=right | 2.9 km || 
|-id=795 bgcolor=#FA8072
| 483795 ||  || — || November 13, 2005 || Socorro || LINEAR || — || align=right | 1.0 km || 
|-id=796 bgcolor=#d6d6d6
| 483796 ||  || — || October 28, 2005 || Kitt Peak || Spacewatch || — || align=right | 1.8 km || 
|-id=797 bgcolor=#d6d6d6
| 483797 ||  || — || November 5, 2005 || Kitt Peak || Spacewatch || — || align=right | 3.1 km || 
|-id=798 bgcolor=#fefefe
| 483798 ||  || — || November 2, 2005 || Mount Lemmon || Mount Lemmon Survey || — || align=right data-sort-value="0.66" | 660 m || 
|-id=799 bgcolor=#fefefe
| 483799 ||  || — || November 12, 2005 || Kitt Peak || Spacewatch || — || align=right data-sort-value="0.57" | 570 m || 
|-id=800 bgcolor=#fefefe
| 483800 ||  || — || October 25, 2005 || Mount Lemmon || Mount Lemmon Survey || — || align=right data-sort-value="0.67" | 670 m || 
|}

483801–483900 

|-bgcolor=#fefefe
| 483801 ||  || — || November 22, 2005 || Kitt Peak || Spacewatch || (2076) || align=right data-sort-value="0.82" | 820 m || 
|-id=802 bgcolor=#fefefe
| 483802 ||  || — || September 30, 2005 || Mount Lemmon || Mount Lemmon Survey || NYS || align=right data-sort-value="0.60" | 600 m || 
|-id=803 bgcolor=#fefefe
| 483803 ||  || — || November 22, 2005 || Kitt Peak || Spacewatch || — || align=right data-sort-value="0.70" | 700 m || 
|-id=804 bgcolor=#fefefe
| 483804 ||  || — || November 1, 2005 || Mount Lemmon || Mount Lemmon Survey || — || align=right data-sort-value="0.78" | 780 m || 
|-id=805 bgcolor=#fefefe
| 483805 ||  || — || October 25, 2005 || Mount Lemmon || Mount Lemmon Survey || — || align=right data-sort-value="0.90" | 900 m || 
|-id=806 bgcolor=#fefefe
| 483806 ||  || — || November 25, 2005 || Kitt Peak || Spacewatch || — || align=right data-sort-value="0.94" | 940 m || 
|-id=807 bgcolor=#fefefe
| 483807 ||  || — || November 25, 2005 || Kitt Peak || Spacewatch || NYS || align=right data-sort-value="0.58" | 580 m || 
|-id=808 bgcolor=#fefefe
| 483808 ||  || — || November 25, 2005 || Kitt Peak || Spacewatch || — || align=right data-sort-value="0.73" | 730 m || 
|-id=809 bgcolor=#fefefe
| 483809 ||  || — || November 5, 2005 || Catalina || CSS || H || align=right data-sort-value="0.72" | 720 m || 
|-id=810 bgcolor=#fefefe
| 483810 ||  || — || November 28, 2005 || Mount Lemmon || Mount Lemmon Survey || — || align=right data-sort-value="0.52" | 520 m || 
|-id=811 bgcolor=#fefefe
| 483811 ||  || — || October 1, 2005 || Mount Lemmon || Mount Lemmon Survey || — || align=right data-sort-value="0.86" | 860 m || 
|-id=812 bgcolor=#fefefe
| 483812 ||  || — || November 10, 2005 || Catalina || CSS || — || align=right data-sort-value="0.75" | 750 m || 
|-id=813 bgcolor=#fefefe
| 483813 ||  || — || November 26, 2005 || Kitt Peak || Spacewatch || — || align=right data-sort-value="0.65" | 650 m || 
|-id=814 bgcolor=#d6d6d6
| 483814 ||  || — || November 28, 2005 || Mount Lemmon || Mount Lemmon Survey || — || align=right | 2.2 km || 
|-id=815 bgcolor=#d6d6d6
| 483815 ||  || — || November 29, 2005 || Socorro || LINEAR || — || align=right | 1.9 km || 
|-id=816 bgcolor=#fefefe
| 483816 ||  || — || November 27, 2005 || Socorro || LINEAR || H || align=right data-sort-value="0.99" | 990 m || 
|-id=817 bgcolor=#fefefe
| 483817 ||  || — || November 25, 2005 || Catalina || CSS || — || align=right data-sort-value="0.82" | 820 m || 
|-id=818 bgcolor=#E9E9E9
| 483818 ||  || — || October 30, 2005 || Kitt Peak || Spacewatch || — || align=right data-sort-value="0.72" | 720 m || 
|-id=819 bgcolor=#fefefe
| 483819 ||  || — || November 22, 2005 || Kitt Peak || Spacewatch || — || align=right data-sort-value="0.75" | 750 m || 
|-id=820 bgcolor=#fefefe
| 483820 ||  || — || November 25, 2005 || Kitt Peak || Spacewatch || NYS || align=right data-sort-value="0.42" | 420 m || 
|-id=821 bgcolor=#d6d6d6
| 483821 ||  || — || November 29, 2005 || Mount Lemmon || Mount Lemmon Survey || — || align=right | 2.1 km || 
|-id=822 bgcolor=#d6d6d6
| 483822 ||  || — || November 22, 2005 || Kitt Peak || Spacewatch || — || align=right | 2.6 km || 
|-id=823 bgcolor=#fefefe
| 483823 ||  || — || November 30, 2005 || Kitt Peak || Spacewatch || — || align=right data-sort-value="0.62" | 620 m || 
|-id=824 bgcolor=#fefefe
| 483824 ||  || — || November 30, 2005 || Kitt Peak || Spacewatch || — || align=right data-sort-value="0.62" | 620 m || 
|-id=825 bgcolor=#fefefe
| 483825 ||  || — || November 30, 2005 || Kitt Peak || Spacewatch || ERI || align=right | 1.1 km || 
|-id=826 bgcolor=#fefefe
| 483826 ||  || — || November 28, 2005 || Catalina || CSS || — || align=right | 1.2 km || 
|-id=827 bgcolor=#fefefe
| 483827 ||  || — || November 26, 2005 || Socorro || LINEAR || — || align=right data-sort-value="0.78" | 780 m || 
|-id=828 bgcolor=#fefefe
| 483828 ||  || — || November 25, 2005 || Kitt Peak || Spacewatch || — || align=right data-sort-value="0.65" | 650 m || 
|-id=829 bgcolor=#d6d6d6
| 483829 ||  || — || November 22, 2005 || Kitt Peak || Spacewatch || — || align=right | 1.8 km || 
|-id=830 bgcolor=#fefefe
| 483830 ||  || — || November 25, 2005 || Mount Lemmon || Mount Lemmon Survey || V || align=right data-sort-value="0.51" | 510 m || 
|-id=831 bgcolor=#d6d6d6
| 483831 ||  || — || December 7, 2005 || Desert Moon || B. L. Stevens || — || align=right | 2.3 km || 
|-id=832 bgcolor=#fefefe
| 483832 ||  || — || December 1, 2005 || Kitt Peak || Spacewatch || NYS || align=right data-sort-value="0.60" | 600 m || 
|-id=833 bgcolor=#d6d6d6
| 483833 ||  || — || October 29, 2005 || Kitt Peak || Spacewatch || TIR || align=right | 2.6 km || 
|-id=834 bgcolor=#d6d6d6
| 483834 ||  || — || December 4, 2005 || Kitt Peak || Spacewatch || — || align=right | 2.3 km || 
|-id=835 bgcolor=#fefefe
| 483835 ||  || — || December 4, 2005 || Kitt Peak || Spacewatch || (2076) || align=right data-sort-value="0.90" | 900 m || 
|-id=836 bgcolor=#d6d6d6
| 483836 ||  || — || December 2, 2005 || Kitt Peak || Spacewatch || — || align=right | 2.7 km || 
|-id=837 bgcolor=#fefefe
| 483837 ||  || — || December 2, 2005 || Kitt Peak || Spacewatch || V || align=right data-sort-value="0.67" | 670 m || 
|-id=838 bgcolor=#d6d6d6
| 483838 ||  || — || December 5, 2005 || Kitt Peak || Spacewatch || — || align=right | 2.5 km || 
|-id=839 bgcolor=#fefefe
| 483839 ||  || — || December 4, 2005 || Kitt Peak || Spacewatch || — || align=right data-sort-value="0.65" | 650 m || 
|-id=840 bgcolor=#d6d6d6
| 483840 ||  || — || November 21, 2005 || Kitt Peak || Spacewatch || — || align=right | 1.9 km || 
|-id=841 bgcolor=#fefefe
| 483841 ||  || — || December 2, 2005 || Socorro || LINEAR || — || align=right data-sort-value="0.62" | 620 m || 
|-id=842 bgcolor=#fefefe
| 483842 ||  || — || December 2, 2005 || Kitt Peak || Spacewatch || — || align=right | 1.3 km || 
|-id=843 bgcolor=#d6d6d6
| 483843 ||  || — || December 8, 2005 || Kitt Peak || Spacewatch || EOScritical || align=right | 1.5 km || 
|-id=844 bgcolor=#d6d6d6
| 483844 ||  || — || December 22, 2005 || Kitt Peak || Spacewatch || — || align=right | 2.6 km || 
|-id=845 bgcolor=#d6d6d6
| 483845 ||  || — || December 21, 2005 || Kitt Peak || Spacewatch || — || align=right | 1.9 km || 
|-id=846 bgcolor=#d6d6d6
| 483846 ||  || — || November 22, 2005 || Kitt Peak || Spacewatch || — || align=right | 2.1 km || 
|-id=847 bgcolor=#d6d6d6
| 483847 ||  || — || December 22, 2005 || Kitt Peak || Spacewatch || — || align=right | 3.3 km || 
|-id=848 bgcolor=#d6d6d6
| 483848 ||  || — || November 4, 2005 || Mount Lemmon || Mount Lemmon Survey || — || align=right | 2.9 km || 
|-id=849 bgcolor=#d6d6d6
| 483849 ||  || — || December 24, 2005 || Kitt Peak || Spacewatch || THM || align=right | 1.7 km || 
|-id=850 bgcolor=#fefefe
| 483850 ||  || — || December 24, 2005 || Kitt Peak || Spacewatch || — || align=right data-sort-value="0.75" | 750 m || 
|-id=851 bgcolor=#fefefe
| 483851 ||  || — || December 22, 2005 || Kitt Peak || Spacewatch || MAScritical || align=right data-sort-value="0.68" | 680 m || 
|-id=852 bgcolor=#d6d6d6
| 483852 ||  || — || December 22, 2005 || Kitt Peak || Spacewatch || — || align=right | 2.1 km || 
|-id=853 bgcolor=#fefefe
| 483853 ||  || — || December 22, 2005 || Kitt Peak || Spacewatch || — || align=right data-sort-value="0.74" | 740 m || 
|-id=854 bgcolor=#d6d6d6
| 483854 ||  || — || December 22, 2005 || Kitt Peak || Spacewatch || — || align=right | 3.0 km || 
|-id=855 bgcolor=#d6d6d6
| 483855 ||  || — || December 2, 2005 || Mount Lemmon || Mount Lemmon Survey || EMA || align=right | 2.4 km || 
|-id=856 bgcolor=#FFC2E0
| 483856 ||  || — || December 28, 2005 || Catalina || CSS || AMOcritical || align=right data-sort-value="0.32" | 320 m || 
|-id=857 bgcolor=#fefefe
| 483857 ||  || — || November 18, 2001 || Kitt Peak || Spacewatch || MAS || align=right data-sort-value="0.57" | 570 m || 
|-id=858 bgcolor=#fefefe
| 483858 ||  || — || December 24, 2005 || Kitt Peak || Spacewatch || MAS || align=right data-sort-value="0.68" | 680 m || 
|-id=859 bgcolor=#d6d6d6
| 483859 ||  || — || November 26, 2005 || Mount Lemmon || Mount Lemmon Survey || — || align=right | 2.5 km || 
|-id=860 bgcolor=#d6d6d6
| 483860 ||  || — || December 2, 2005 || Mount Lemmon || Mount Lemmon Survey || EOS || align=right | 1.6 km || 
|-id=861 bgcolor=#fefefe
| 483861 ||  || — || December 26, 2005 || Mount Lemmon || Mount Lemmon Survey || — || align=right data-sort-value="0.86" | 860 m || 
|-id=862 bgcolor=#fefefe
| 483862 ||  || — || December 24, 2005 || Kitt Peak || Spacewatch || ERI || align=right | 1.3 km || 
|-id=863 bgcolor=#d6d6d6
| 483863 ||  || — || December 25, 2005 || Kitt Peak || Spacewatch || — || align=right | 2.4 km || 
|-id=864 bgcolor=#fefefe
| 483864 ||  || — || December 25, 2005 || Kitt Peak || Spacewatch || NYS || align=right data-sort-value="0.52" | 520 m || 
|-id=865 bgcolor=#d6d6d6
| 483865 ||  || — || December 25, 2005 || Kitt Peak || Spacewatch || — || align=right | 2.7 km || 
|-id=866 bgcolor=#fefefe
| 483866 ||  || — || December 25, 2005 || Mount Lemmon || Mount Lemmon Survey || — || align=right data-sort-value="0.87" | 870 m || 
|-id=867 bgcolor=#d6d6d6
| 483867 ||  || — || November 25, 2005 || Mount Lemmon || Mount Lemmon Survey || — || align=right | 2.8 km || 
|-id=868 bgcolor=#fefefe
| 483868 ||  || — || December 24, 2005 || Kitt Peak || Spacewatch || — || align=right data-sort-value="0.83" | 830 m || 
|-id=869 bgcolor=#d6d6d6
| 483869 ||  || — || December 1, 2005 || Mount Lemmon || Mount Lemmon Survey || EOS || align=right | 1.7 km || 
|-id=870 bgcolor=#d6d6d6
| 483870 ||  || — || December 26, 2005 || Kitt Peak || Spacewatch || — || align=right | 3.7 km || 
|-id=871 bgcolor=#fefefe
| 483871 ||  || — || November 30, 2005 || Mount Lemmon || Mount Lemmon Survey || ERI || align=right | 1.2 km || 
|-id=872 bgcolor=#d6d6d6
| 483872 ||  || — || December 4, 2005 || Kitt Peak || Spacewatch || — || align=right | 2.2 km || 
|-id=873 bgcolor=#d6d6d6
| 483873 ||  || — || December 28, 2005 || Mount Lemmon || Mount Lemmon Survey || — || align=right | 2.3 km || 
|-id=874 bgcolor=#fefefe
| 483874 ||  || — || December 28, 2005 || Mount Lemmon || Mount Lemmon Survey || — || align=right data-sort-value="0.78" | 780 m || 
|-id=875 bgcolor=#d6d6d6
| 483875 ||  || — || November 25, 2005 || Mount Lemmon || Mount Lemmon Survey || — || align=right | 2.5 km || 
|-id=876 bgcolor=#d6d6d6
| 483876 ||  || — || December 27, 2005 || Kitt Peak || Spacewatch || — || align=right | 4.2 km || 
|-id=877 bgcolor=#d6d6d6
| 483877 ||  || — || December 3, 1999 || Kitt Peak || Spacewatch || — || align=right | 3.9 km || 
|-id=878 bgcolor=#FFC2E0
| 483878 ||  || — || December 31, 2005 || Siding Spring || SSS || AMO +1km || align=right | 1.1 km || 
|-id=879 bgcolor=#d6d6d6
| 483879 ||  || — || December 22, 2005 || Kitt Peak || Spacewatch || THM || align=right | 2.0 km || 
|-id=880 bgcolor=#fefefe
| 483880 ||  || — || December 30, 2005 || Kitt Peak || Spacewatch || — || align=right data-sort-value="0.49" | 490 m || 
|-id=881 bgcolor=#d6d6d6
| 483881 ||  || — || December 2, 2005 || Mount Lemmon || Mount Lemmon Survey || — || align=right | 2.3 km || 
|-id=882 bgcolor=#fefefe
| 483882 ||  || — || December 30, 2005 || Mount Lemmon || Mount Lemmon Survey || — || align=right data-sort-value="0.59" | 590 m || 
|-id=883 bgcolor=#d6d6d6
| 483883 ||  || — || December 25, 2005 || Kitt Peak || Spacewatch || — || align=right | 2.0 km || 
|-id=884 bgcolor=#d6d6d6
| 483884 ||  || — || December 29, 2005 || Kitt Peak || Spacewatch || — || align=right | 2.4 km || 
|-id=885 bgcolor=#d6d6d6
| 483885 ||  || — || December 30, 2005 || Kitt Peak || Spacewatch || — || align=right | 2.8 km || 
|-id=886 bgcolor=#d6d6d6
| 483886 ||  || — || December 30, 2005 || Kitt Peak || Spacewatch || — || align=right | 2.0 km || 
|-id=887 bgcolor=#fefefe
| 483887 ||  || — || November 25, 2005 || Mount Lemmon || Mount Lemmon Survey || — || align=right data-sort-value="0.59" | 590 m || 
|-id=888 bgcolor=#d6d6d6
| 483888 ||  || — || December 28, 2005 || Mount Lemmon || Mount Lemmon Survey || — || align=right | 4.2 km || 
|-id=889 bgcolor=#d6d6d6
| 483889 ||  || — || December 25, 2005 || Kitt Peak || Spacewatch || — || align=right | 2.7 km || 
|-id=890 bgcolor=#d6d6d6
| 483890 ||  || — || November 25, 2005 || Kitt Peak || Spacewatch || — || align=right | 2.2 km || 
|-id=891 bgcolor=#d6d6d6
| 483891 ||  || — || January 6, 2006 || Gnosca || S. Sposetti || — || align=right | 3.5 km || 
|-id=892 bgcolor=#fefefe
| 483892 ||  || — || December 28, 2005 || Kitt Peak || Spacewatch || critical || align=right data-sort-value="0.59" | 590 m || 
|-id=893 bgcolor=#d6d6d6
| 483893 ||  || — || January 5, 2006 || Socorro || LINEAR || — || align=right | 2.7 km || 
|-id=894 bgcolor=#d6d6d6
| 483894 ||  || — || December 2, 2005 || Mount Lemmon || Mount Lemmon Survey || — || align=right | 2.5 km || 
|-id=895 bgcolor=#d6d6d6
| 483895 ||  || — || December 1, 2005 || Mount Lemmon || Mount Lemmon Survey || EOS || align=right | 1.8 km || 
|-id=896 bgcolor=#fefefe
| 483896 ||  || — || January 4, 2006 || Kitt Peak || Spacewatch || — || align=right data-sort-value="0.71" | 710 m || 
|-id=897 bgcolor=#fefefe
| 483897 ||  || — || January 4, 2006 || Kitt Peak || Spacewatch || — || align=right data-sort-value="0.75" | 750 m || 
|-id=898 bgcolor=#d6d6d6
| 483898 ||  || — || December 28, 2005 || Kitt Peak || Spacewatch || — || align=right | 3.1 km || 
|-id=899 bgcolor=#d6d6d6
| 483899 ||  || — || January 6, 2006 || Mount Lemmon || Mount Lemmon Survey || — || align=right | 2.4 km || 
|-id=900 bgcolor=#d6d6d6
| 483900 ||  || — || December 30, 2005 || Mount Lemmon || Mount Lemmon Survey || — || align=right | 2.8 km || 
|}

483901–484000 

|-bgcolor=#fefefe
| 483901 ||  || — || December 25, 2005 || Mount Lemmon || Mount Lemmon Survey || — || align=right data-sort-value="0.55" | 550 m || 
|-id=902 bgcolor=#fefefe
| 483902 ||  || — || January 5, 2006 || Kitt Peak || Spacewatch || NYS || align=right data-sort-value="0.52" | 520 m || 
|-id=903 bgcolor=#d6d6d6
| 483903 ||  || — || December 28, 2005 || Kitt Peak || Spacewatch || — || align=right | 2.1 km || 
|-id=904 bgcolor=#d6d6d6
| 483904 ||  || — || December 28, 2005 || Kitt Peak || Spacewatch || — || align=right | 2.3 km || 
|-id=905 bgcolor=#d6d6d6
| 483905 ||  || — || December 28, 2005 || Kitt Peak || Spacewatch || — || align=right | 3.1 km || 
|-id=906 bgcolor=#fefefe
| 483906 ||  || — || January 8, 2006 || Mount Lemmon || Mount Lemmon Survey || — || align=right data-sort-value="0.62" | 620 m || 
|-id=907 bgcolor=#d6d6d6
| 483907 ||  || — || January 6, 2006 || Socorro || LINEAR || — || align=right | 3.4 km || 
|-id=908 bgcolor=#fefefe
| 483908 ||  || — || January 7, 2006 || Mount Lemmon || Mount Lemmon Survey || NYS || align=right data-sort-value="0.58" | 580 m || 
|-id=909 bgcolor=#fefefe
| 483909 ||  || — || January 8, 2006 || Kitt Peak || Spacewatch || MAS || align=right data-sort-value="0.45" | 450 m || 
|-id=910 bgcolor=#d6d6d6
| 483910 ||  || — || January 5, 2006 || Mount Lemmon || Mount Lemmon Survey || EOS || align=right | 2.2 km || 
|-id=911 bgcolor=#d6d6d6
| 483911 ||  || — || January 4, 2006 || Mount Lemmon || Mount Lemmon Survey || — || align=right | 2.9 km || 
|-id=912 bgcolor=#fefefe
| 483912 ||  || — || January 22, 2006 || Mount Lemmon || Mount Lemmon Survey || MAS || align=right data-sort-value="0.58" | 580 m || 
|-id=913 bgcolor=#fefefe
| 483913 ||  || — || January 22, 2006 || Mount Lemmon || Mount Lemmon Survey || — || align=right data-sort-value="0.82" | 820 m || 
|-id=914 bgcolor=#fefefe
| 483914 ||  || — || January 23, 2006 || Mount Lemmon || Mount Lemmon Survey || NYS || align=right data-sort-value="0.66" | 660 m || 
|-id=915 bgcolor=#fefefe
| 483915 ||  || — || January 20, 2006 || Kitt Peak || Spacewatch || — || align=right data-sort-value="0.88" | 880 m || 
|-id=916 bgcolor=#d6d6d6
| 483916 ||  || — || January 23, 2006 || Kitt Peak || Spacewatch || — || align=right | 2.2 km || 
|-id=917 bgcolor=#d6d6d6
| 483917 ||  || — || January 23, 2006 || Mount Lemmon || Mount Lemmon Survey || — || align=right | 2.3 km || 
|-id=918 bgcolor=#d6d6d6
| 483918 ||  || — || January 23, 2006 || Mount Lemmon || Mount Lemmon Survey || critical || align=right | 1.9 km || 
|-id=919 bgcolor=#d6d6d6
| 483919 ||  || — || January 8, 2006 || Kitt Peak || Spacewatch || THM || align=right | 1.9 km || 
|-id=920 bgcolor=#fefefe
| 483920 ||  || — || January 25, 2006 || Kitt Peak || Spacewatch || MAS || align=right data-sort-value="0.62" | 620 m || 
|-id=921 bgcolor=#d6d6d6
| 483921 ||  || — || January 7, 2006 || Kitt Peak || Spacewatch || — || align=right | 3.2 km || 
|-id=922 bgcolor=#fefefe
| 483922 ||  || — || January 25, 2006 || Kitt Peak || Spacewatch || MAS || align=right data-sort-value="0.59" | 590 m || 
|-id=923 bgcolor=#fefefe
| 483923 ||  || — || January 25, 2006 || Kitt Peak || Spacewatch || — || align=right data-sort-value="0.62" | 620 m || 
|-id=924 bgcolor=#fefefe
| 483924 ||  || — || January 22, 2006 || Anderson Mesa || LONEOS || H || align=right data-sort-value="0.67" | 670 m || 
|-id=925 bgcolor=#fefefe
| 483925 ||  || — || December 1, 2005 || Mount Lemmon || Mount Lemmon Survey || H || align=right data-sort-value="0.69" | 690 m || 
|-id=926 bgcolor=#fefefe
| 483926 ||  || — || January 20, 2006 || Kitt Peak || Spacewatch || — || align=right data-sort-value="0.59" | 590 m || 
|-id=927 bgcolor=#fefefe
| 483927 ||  || — || January 23, 2006 || Kitt Peak || Spacewatch || — || align=right data-sort-value="0.77" | 770 m || 
|-id=928 bgcolor=#fefefe
| 483928 ||  || — || January 10, 2006 || Mount Lemmon || Mount Lemmon Survey || — || align=right data-sort-value="0.72" | 720 m || 
|-id=929 bgcolor=#fefefe
| 483929 ||  || — || January 23, 2006 || Kitt Peak || Spacewatch || — || align=right data-sort-value="0.68" | 680 m || 
|-id=930 bgcolor=#fefefe
| 483930 ||  || — || January 23, 2006 || Kitt Peak || Spacewatch || — || align=right data-sort-value="0.78" | 780 m || 
|-id=931 bgcolor=#d6d6d6
| 483931 ||  || — || January 23, 2006 || Kitt Peak || Spacewatch || — || align=right | 2.7 km || 
|-id=932 bgcolor=#fefefe
| 483932 ||  || — || January 25, 2006 || Kitt Peak || Spacewatch || — || align=right data-sort-value="0.61" | 610 m || 
|-id=933 bgcolor=#fefefe
| 483933 ||  || — || January 25, 2006 || Kitt Peak || Spacewatch || — || align=right data-sort-value="0.62" | 620 m || 
|-id=934 bgcolor=#fefefe
| 483934 ||  || — || August 14, 2004 || Campo Imperatore || CINEOS || — || align=right data-sort-value="0.73" | 730 m || 
|-id=935 bgcolor=#fefefe
| 483935 ||  || — || January 20, 2006 || Kitt Peak || Spacewatch || — || align=right data-sort-value="0.65" | 650 m || 
|-id=936 bgcolor=#d6d6d6
| 483936 ||  || — || January 23, 2006 || Kitt Peak || Spacewatch || — || align=right | 2.2 km || 
|-id=937 bgcolor=#d6d6d6
| 483937 ||  || — || January 23, 2006 || Kitt Peak || Spacewatch || EOS || align=right | 1.6 km || 
|-id=938 bgcolor=#fefefe
| 483938 ||  || — || January 8, 2006 || Kitt Peak || Spacewatch || — || align=right data-sort-value="0.48" | 480 m || 
|-id=939 bgcolor=#fefefe
| 483939 ||  || — || January 5, 2006 || Mount Lemmon || Mount Lemmon Survey || — || align=right data-sort-value="0.65" | 650 m || 
|-id=940 bgcolor=#fefefe
| 483940 ||  || — || January 25, 2006 || Kitt Peak || Spacewatch || MAS || align=right data-sort-value="0.57" | 570 m || 
|-id=941 bgcolor=#d6d6d6
| 483941 ||  || — || January 25, 2006 || Kitt Peak || Spacewatch || — || align=right | 3.1 km || 
|-id=942 bgcolor=#fefefe
| 483942 ||  || — || January 25, 2006 || Kitt Peak || Spacewatch || CLA || align=right | 1.3 km || 
|-id=943 bgcolor=#fefefe
| 483943 ||  || — || January 26, 2006 || Kitt Peak || Spacewatch || — || align=right data-sort-value="0.75" | 750 m || 
|-id=944 bgcolor=#d6d6d6
| 483944 ||  || — || January 26, 2006 || Kitt Peak || Spacewatch || — || align=right | 2.4 km || 
|-id=945 bgcolor=#d6d6d6
| 483945 ||  || — || January 26, 2006 || Kitt Peak || Spacewatch || THM || align=right | 1.9 km || 
|-id=946 bgcolor=#d6d6d6
| 483946 ||  || — || January 26, 2006 || Kitt Peak || Spacewatch || critical || align=right | 2.1 km || 
|-id=947 bgcolor=#d6d6d6
| 483947 ||  || — || January 26, 2006 || Kitt Peak || Spacewatch || — || align=right | 2.8 km || 
|-id=948 bgcolor=#d6d6d6
| 483948 ||  || — || January 26, 2006 || Kitt Peak || Spacewatch || — || align=right | 2.6 km || 
|-id=949 bgcolor=#d6d6d6
| 483949 ||  || — || January 26, 2006 || Mount Lemmon || Mount Lemmon Survey || — || align=right | 2.5 km || 
|-id=950 bgcolor=#fefefe
| 483950 ||  || — || December 25, 2005 || Mount Lemmon || Mount Lemmon Survey || — || align=right data-sort-value="0.70" | 700 m || 
|-id=951 bgcolor=#fefefe
| 483951 ||  || — || January 31, 2006 || Vallemare Borbona || V. S. Casulli || — || align=right data-sort-value="0.65" | 650 m || 
|-id=952 bgcolor=#d6d6d6
| 483952 ||  || — || January 25, 2006 || Kitt Peak || Spacewatch || — || align=right | 2.7 km || 
|-id=953 bgcolor=#fefefe
| 483953 ||  || — || January 7, 2006 || Mount Lemmon || Mount Lemmon Survey || — || align=right data-sort-value="0.80" | 800 m || 
|-id=954 bgcolor=#fefefe
| 483954 ||  || — || January 25, 2006 || Kitt Peak || Spacewatch || — || align=right data-sort-value="0.78" | 780 m || 
|-id=955 bgcolor=#fefefe
| 483955 ||  || — || January 26, 2006 || Kitt Peak || Spacewatch || MAS || align=right data-sort-value="0.64" | 640 m || 
|-id=956 bgcolor=#d6d6d6
| 483956 ||  || — || January 27, 2006 || Kitt Peak || Spacewatch || — || align=right | 2.4 km || 
|-id=957 bgcolor=#d6d6d6
| 483957 ||  || — || January 6, 2006 || Mount Lemmon || Mount Lemmon Survey || — || align=right | 1.8 km || 
|-id=958 bgcolor=#d6d6d6
| 483958 ||  || — || January 23, 2006 || Kitt Peak || Spacewatch || — || align=right | 3.2 km || 
|-id=959 bgcolor=#d6d6d6
| 483959 ||  || — || January 30, 2006 || Kitt Peak || Spacewatch || — || align=right | 3.9 km || 
|-id=960 bgcolor=#d6d6d6
| 483960 ||  || — || January 30, 2006 || Kitt Peak || Spacewatch || — || align=right | 2.7 km || 
|-id=961 bgcolor=#fefefe
| 483961 ||  || — || January 31, 2006 || Kitt Peak || Spacewatch || NYS || align=right data-sort-value="0.58" | 580 m || 
|-id=962 bgcolor=#fefefe
| 483962 ||  || — || January 31, 2006 || Kitt Peak || Spacewatch || — || align=right data-sort-value="0.61" | 610 m || 
|-id=963 bgcolor=#d6d6d6
| 483963 ||  || — || January 23, 2006 || Kitt Peak || Spacewatch || — || align=right | 2.2 km || 
|-id=964 bgcolor=#d6d6d6
| 483964 ||  || — || January 31, 2006 || Mount Lemmon || Mount Lemmon Survey || — || align=right | 2.7 km || 
|-id=965 bgcolor=#d6d6d6
| 483965 ||  || — || January 31, 2006 || Kitt Peak || Spacewatch || — || align=right | 3.3 km || 
|-id=966 bgcolor=#fefefe
| 483966 ||  || — || January 6, 2006 || Catalina || CSS || H || align=right data-sort-value="0.54" | 540 m || 
|-id=967 bgcolor=#d6d6d6
| 483967 ||  || — || January 30, 2006 || Kitt Peak || Spacewatch || — || align=right | 2.4 km || 
|-id=968 bgcolor=#C2FFFF
| 483968 ||  || — || January 8, 2006 || Mount Lemmon || Mount Lemmon Survey || L5 || align=right | 12 km || 
|-id=969 bgcolor=#fefefe
| 483969 ||  || — || January 23, 2006 || Kitt Peak || Spacewatch || NYS || align=right data-sort-value="0.63" | 630 m || 
|-id=970 bgcolor=#d6d6d6
| 483970 ||  || — || January 23, 2006 || Kitt Peak || Spacewatch || — || align=right | 1.8 km || 
|-id=971 bgcolor=#fefefe
| 483971 ||  || — || January 31, 2006 || Kitt Peak || Spacewatch || — || align=right data-sort-value="0.78" | 780 m || 
|-id=972 bgcolor=#d6d6d6
| 483972 ||  || — || January 23, 2006 || Kitt Peak || Spacewatch || THB || align=right | 3.0 km || 
|-id=973 bgcolor=#fefefe
| 483973 ||  || — || January 23, 2006 || Kitt Peak || Spacewatch || — || align=right data-sort-value="0.81" | 810 m || 
|-id=974 bgcolor=#d6d6d6
| 483974 ||  || — || January 31, 2006 || Kitt Peak || Spacewatch || — || align=right | 2.6 km || 
|-id=975 bgcolor=#d6d6d6
| 483975 ||  || — || January 31, 2006 || Kitt Peak || Spacewatch || THM || align=right | 2.0 km || 
|-id=976 bgcolor=#fefefe
| 483976 ||  || — || January 31, 2006 || Kitt Peak || Spacewatch || NYS || align=right data-sort-value="0.63" | 630 m || 
|-id=977 bgcolor=#d6d6d6
| 483977 ||  || — || January 31, 2006 || Kitt Peak || Spacewatch || — || align=right | 2.7 km || 
|-id=978 bgcolor=#fefefe
| 483978 ||  || — || January 31, 2006 || Kitt Peak || Spacewatch || — || align=right data-sort-value="0.75" | 750 m || 
|-id=979 bgcolor=#fefefe
| 483979 ||  || — || January 22, 2006 || Mount Lemmon || Mount Lemmon Survey || — || align=right data-sort-value="0.71" | 710 m || 
|-id=980 bgcolor=#fefefe
| 483980 ||  || — || January 21, 2006 || Mount Lemmon || Mount Lemmon Survey || — || align=right | 1.3 km || 
|-id=981 bgcolor=#fefefe
| 483981 ||  || — || January 26, 2006 || Kitt Peak || Spacewatch || MAS || align=right data-sort-value="0.62" | 620 m || 
|-id=982 bgcolor=#fefefe
| 483982 ||  || — || January 30, 2006 || Kitt Peak || Spacewatch || — || align=right data-sort-value="0.65" | 650 m || 
|-id=983 bgcolor=#fefefe
| 483983 ||  || — || January 23, 2006 || Kitt Peak || Spacewatch || — || align=right data-sort-value="0.77" | 770 m || 
|-id=984 bgcolor=#d6d6d6
| 483984 ||  || — || January 23, 2006 || Kitt Peak || Spacewatch || — || align=right | 2.4 km || 
|-id=985 bgcolor=#d6d6d6
| 483985 ||  || — || January 30, 2006 || Kitt Peak || Spacewatch || — || align=right | 2.5 km || 
|-id=986 bgcolor=#d6d6d6
| 483986 ||  || — || January 30, 2006 || Kitt Peak || Spacewatch || — || align=right | 2.3 km || 
|-id=987 bgcolor=#fefefe
| 483987 ||  || — || February 1, 2006 || Mount Lemmon || Mount Lemmon Survey || — || align=right data-sort-value="0.81" | 810 m || 
|-id=988 bgcolor=#d6d6d6
| 483988 ||  || — || February 1, 2006 || Mount Lemmon || Mount Lemmon Survey || — || align=right | 3.2 km || 
|-id=989 bgcolor=#FFC2E0
| 483989 ||  || — || February 9, 2006 || Anderson Mesa || LONEOS || APOPHAcritical || align=right data-sort-value="0.28" | 280 m || 
|-id=990 bgcolor=#fefefe
| 483990 ||  || — || January 9, 2006 || Kitt Peak || Spacewatch || — || align=right data-sort-value="0.70" | 700 m || 
|-id=991 bgcolor=#d6d6d6
| 483991 ||  || — || January 23, 2006 || Kitt Peak || Spacewatch || — || align=right | 3.2 km || 
|-id=992 bgcolor=#d6d6d6
| 483992 ||  || — || January 5, 2006 || Mount Lemmon || Mount Lemmon Survey || — || align=right | 2.7 km || 
|-id=993 bgcolor=#d6d6d6
| 483993 ||  || — || January 22, 2006 || Mount Lemmon || Mount Lemmon Survey || — || align=right | 2.5 km || 
|-id=994 bgcolor=#d6d6d6
| 483994 ||  || — || January 10, 2006 || Mount Lemmon || Mount Lemmon Survey || — || align=right | 2.8 km || 
|-id=995 bgcolor=#d6d6d6
| 483995 ||  || — || February 2, 2006 || Kitt Peak || Spacewatch || — || align=right | 2.2 km || 
|-id=996 bgcolor=#fefefe
| 483996 ||  || — || February 2, 2006 || Kitt Peak || Spacewatch || — || align=right data-sort-value="0.88" | 880 m || 
|-id=997 bgcolor=#d6d6d6
| 483997 ||  || — || February 2, 2006 || Mount Lemmon || Mount Lemmon Survey || — || align=right | 2.9 km || 
|-id=998 bgcolor=#fefefe
| 483998 ||  || — || February 3, 2006 || Socorro || LINEAR || — || align=right data-sort-value="0.71" | 710 m || 
|-id=999 bgcolor=#d6d6d6
| 483999 ||  || — || February 4, 2006 || Kitt Peak || Spacewatch || — || align=right | 2.0 km || 
|-id=000 bgcolor=#d6d6d6
| 484000 ||  || — || January 6, 2006 || Catalina || CSS || — || align=right | 4.0 km || 
|}

References

External links 
 Discovery Circumstances: Numbered Minor Planets (480001)–(485000) (IAU Minor Planet Center)

0483